= Cypraea =

Cypraea Temporal range: Miocene–Recent
- Five views of a shell of Cypraea tigris

Scientific classification
- Kingdom: Animalia
- Phylum: Mollusca
- Class: Gastropoda
- Subclass: Caenogastropoda
- Order: Littorinimorpha
- Family: Cypraeidae
- Subfamily: Cypraeinae
- Genus: Cypraea; Linnaeus, 1758

Type species
- Cypraea tigris Linnaeus, 1758

Synonyms
- Pantherinaria Sacco, 1894

Genus of gastropods

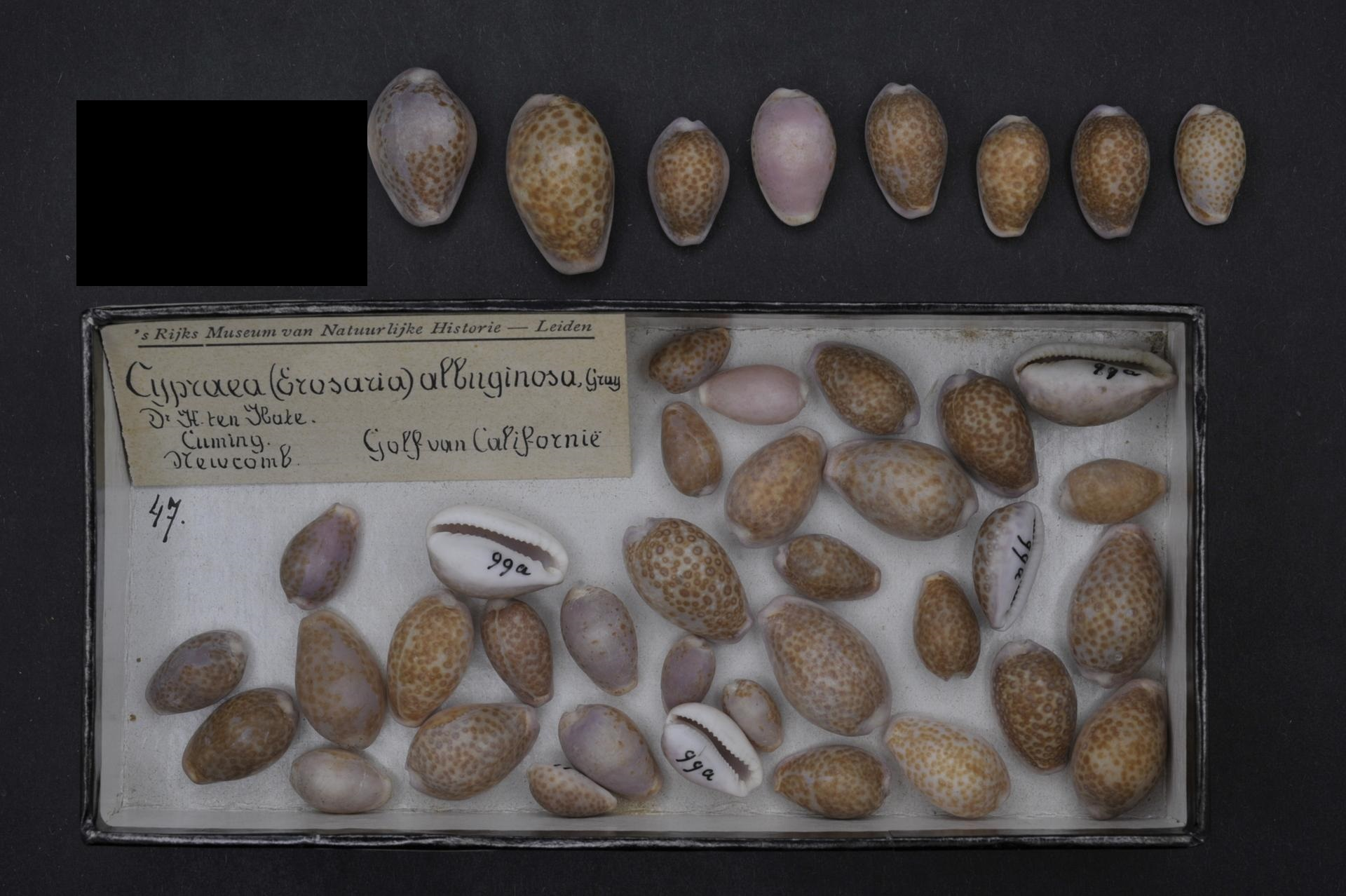
Cypraea albuginosa, museum specimens. Naturalis.

Cypraea is a genus of medium-sized to large sea snails or cowries, marine gastropod mollusks in the family Cypraeidae, the cowries.

== Species ==
Species within the genus Cypraea include:

- † Cypraea ficoides (Hutton, 1873)
- Cypraea pantherina Lightfoot, 1786
- † Cypraea porcellus Brocchi, 1814
- Cypraea tigris Linnaeus, 1758

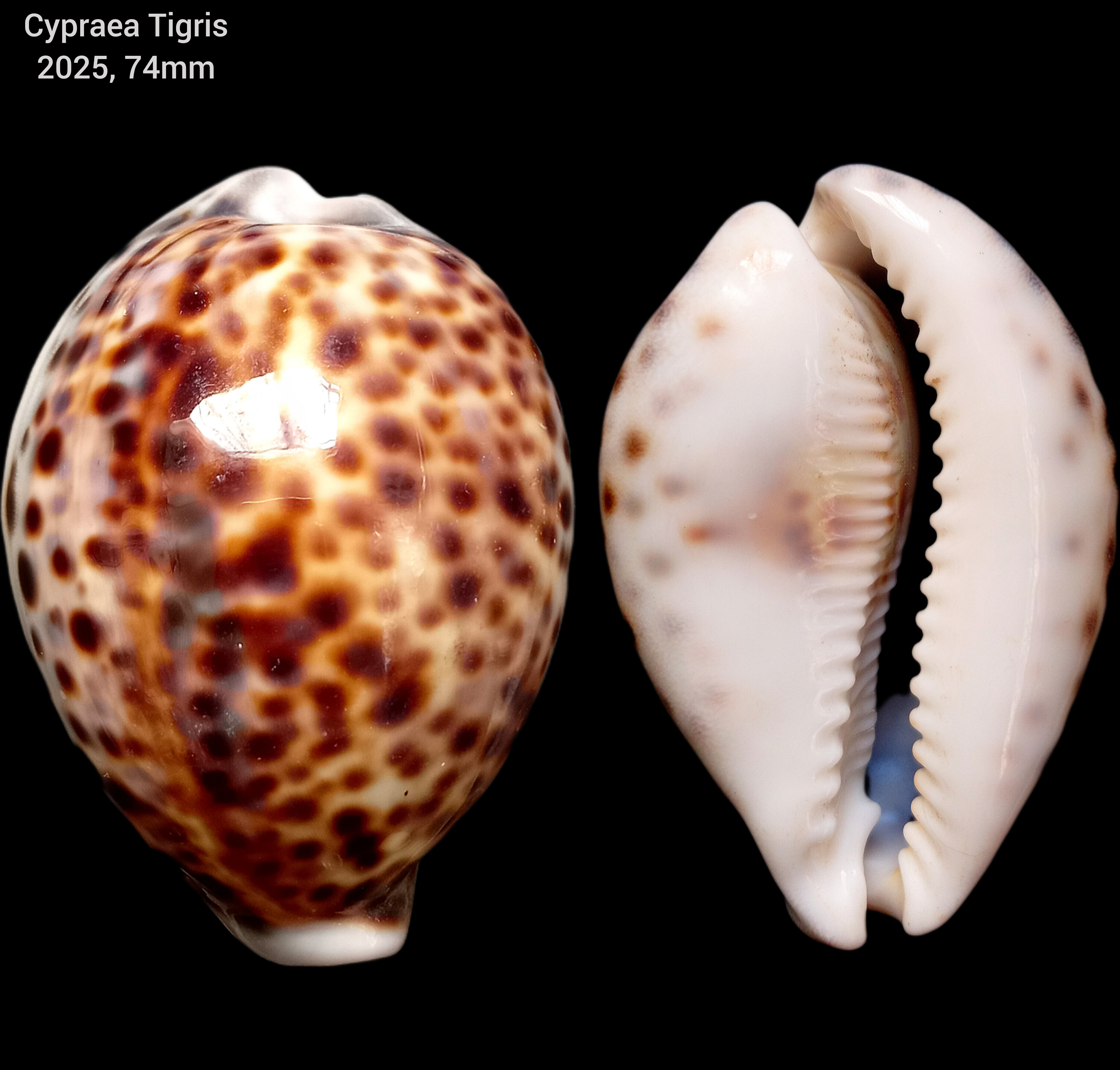
Cypraea Tigris

Nomen dubium

- Cypraea contrastriata Perry, 1811 (synonyms: Arestorides argus contrastriata (Perry, 1811); Cypraea argus contrastriata Perry, 1811; Talparia argus contrastriata (Perry, 1811) )

=== Synonyms ===
Almost all species previously belonging to Cypraea have been reassigned to other genera within the family Cypraeidae:

- Cypraea achatidea Sowerby, 1837: synonym of Schilderia achatidea
- Cypraea acicularis Gmelin, 1791: synonym of Erosaria acicularis
- Cypraea aenigma Lorenz, 2002: synonym of Nesiocypraea aenigma
- Cypraea albuginosa Gray, 1825: synonym of Erosaria albuginosa
- Cypraea alexhuberti Lorenz & Huber, 1999: synonym of Austrasiatica alexhuberti
- Cypraea alfredensis (Schilder & Schilder, 1929): synonym of Cypraeovula alfredensis (Schilder & Schilder, 1929)
- Cypraea algoensis Gray, 1825: synonym of Cypraeovula algoensis
- Cypraea alisonae Burgess, 1983: synonym of Blasicrura alisonae
- Cypraea amarata (Meuschen, 1787): synonym of Mauritia scurra
- Cypraea amphitales Melvill, 1888 : synonym of Cypraeovula amphitales
- Cypraea androyensis Blocher & Lorenz, 1999: synonym of Palmadusta androyensis
- Cypraea angelicae Clover, 1974: synonym of Zonaria angelicae
- Cypraea angioyorum Biraghi, 1978: synonym of Erronea angioyorum
- Cypraea angustata Gmelin, 1791: synonym of Notocypraea angustata
- Cypraea annettae Dall, 1909: synonym of Pseudozonaria annettae
- Cypraea annulus Linnaeus, 1758: synonym of Monetaria annulus
- Cypraea arabica Linnaeus, 1758: synonym of Mauritia arabica
- Cypraea arabicula: synonym of Pseudozonaria arabicula
- Cypraea argus Linnaeus, 1758: synonym of Arestorides argus
- Cypraea armeniaca Verco, 1912: synonym of Umbilia armeniaca
- Cypraea artuffeli Jousseaume, 1876: synonym of Palmadusta artuffeli
- Cypraea aurantium Gmelin, 1791: synonym of Lyncina aurantium
- Cypraea barbieri Raybaudi, 1986: synonym of Purpuradusta barbieri
- Cypraea asellus Linnaeus, 1758: synonym of Palmadusta asellus
- Cypraea barclayi Reeve, 1857: synonym of Contradusta barclayi
- Cypraea beckii Gaskoin, 1836 is a synonym of Erosaria beckii
- Cypraea bernardi Richard, 1974: synonym of Erosaria bernardi
- Cypraea bistrinotata Schilder & Schilder, 1937: synonym of Pustularia bistrinotata
- Cypraea boivinii Kiener, 1843: synonym of Erosaria boivinii
- Cypraea boucheti Lorenz, 2002: synonym of Palmulacypraea boucheti
- Cypraea bregeriana Crosse, 1868: synonym of Contradusta bregeriana
- Cypraea brevidentata Sowerby, 1870: synonym of Bistolida brevidentata
- Cypraea broderipii Gray in Sowerby, 1832: synonym of Lyncina broderipii
- Cypraea camelopardalis Perry, 1811: synonym of Lyncina camelopardalis
- Cypraea capensis: synonym of Cypraeovula capensis
- Cypraea capricornica Lorenz, 1989is a synonym of Umbilia capricornica
- Cypraea caputdraconis Melvill, 1888: synonym of Monetaria caputdraconis
- Cypraea caputserpentis Linnaeus, 1758: synonym of Erosaria caputserpentis
- Cypraea carneola Linnaeus, 1758: synonym of Lyncina carneola
- Cypraea carneola sowerbyi Anton, 1838: synonym of Lyncina carneola (Linnaeus, 1758)
- Cypraea castanea Higgins, 1868: synonym of Cypraeovula castanea
- Cypraea catholicorum Schilder, 1938: synonym of Cribrarula catholicorum
- Cypraea caurica Linnaeus, 1758: synonym of Erronea caurica
- Cypraea cernica Sowerby, 1870: synonym of Erosaria cernica
- Cypraea cervinetta Kiener, 1843: synonym of Macrocypraea cervinetta
- Cypraea cervus Linnaeus, 1771: synonym of Macrocypraea cervus
- Cypraea chiapponii Lorenz, 1999: synonym of Pustularia chiapponii
- Cypraea childreni Gray, 1825: synonym of Ipsa childreni
- Cypraea chinensis Gmelin, 1791: synonym of Ovatipsa chinensis
- Cypraea cicercula Linnaeus, 1758: synonym of Pustularia cicercula
- Cypraea cinerea Gmelin, 1791: synonym of Luria cinerea
- Cypraea citrina Gray, 1825: synonym of Erosaria citrina
- Cypraea clandestina Linnaeus, 1767: synonym of Palmadusta clandestina
- Cypraea cohenae Burgess, 1965: synonym of Cypraeovula cohenae
- Cypraea colligata Lorenz, 2002: synonym of Cypraeovula colligata
- Cypraea coloba Melvill, 1888: synonym of Ovatipsa coloba
- Cypraea comptonii Gray, 1847: synonym of Notocypraea comptoni
- Cypraea connelli Liltved, 1983: synonym of Cypraeovula connelli
- Cypraea conoidea Scopoli, 1786: synonym of Morum oniscus (Linnaeus, 1767)
- Cypraea contaminata Sowerby, 1832: synonym of Palmadusta contaminata
- Cypraea controversa Gray, 1824: synonym of Luria controversa
- Cypraea coronata Schilder 1930: synonym of Cypraeovula coronata
- Cypraea costispunctata G. B. Sowerby II, 1870: synonym of Pusula costispunctata (G. B. Sowerby II, 1870)
- Cypraea coxeni Cox, 1873: synonym of Eclogavena coxeni
- Cypraea cribellum Gaskoin, 1849: synonym of Cribrarula cribellum
- Cypraea cribraria Linnaeus, 1758: synonym of Cribrarula cribraria
- Cypraea cruenta: synonym of Ovatipsa chinensis
- Cypraea cruickshanki Kilburn, 1972: synonym of Cypraeovula cruickshanki
- Cypraea cumingii Sowerby, 1832: synonym of Cribrarula cumingii
- Cypraea cylindrica Born, 1778: synonym of Erronea cylindrica
- Cypraea dayritiana Cate, 1963: synonym of Eclogavena dayritiana
- Cypraea decipiens Smith, 1880: synonym of Zoila decipiens
- Cypraea declivis Sowerby II, 1870: synonym of Notocypraea declivis
- Cypraea deforgesi Lorenz, 2002: synonym of Austrasiatica deforgesi
- Cypraea depressa Gray, 1824: synonym of Mauritia depressa
- Cypraea diauges Melvill 1888 syn. of Bistolida diauges
- Cypraea dillwyni Schilder 1922: synonym of Cryptocypraea dillwyni
- Cypraea diluculum Reeve, 1845: synonym of Palmadusta diluculum
- Cypraea eburnea Barnes, 1824: synonym of Erosaria eburnea
- Cypraea edentula: synonym of Cypraeovula edentula
- Cypraea eglantina Duclos, 1833: synonym of Mauritia eglantina
- Cypraea eludens Raybaudi, 1991: synonym of Zoila eludens
- Cypraea englerti Summers & Burgess, 1965: synonym of Erosaria englerti
- Cypraea erosa Linnaeus, 1758: synonym of Erosaria erosa
- Cypraea errones Linnaeus, 1758: synonym of Erronea errones
- Cypraea erythraeensis Sowerby, 1837: synonym of Bistolida erythraeensis
- Cypraea esontropia Duclos, 1833: synonym of Cribrarula esontropia
- Cypraea exmouthensis Melvill, 1888: synonym of Cribrarula exmouthensis
- Cypraea exusta Sowerby, 1832: synonym of Talparia exusta
- Cypraea fallax Smith, 1881: synonym of Cribrarula fallax
- Cypraea felina Gmelin, 1791: synonym of Melicerona felina
- Cypraea fernandoi Cate, 1969: synonym of Erosa fernadoi
- Cypraea fimbriata Gmelin, 1791: synonym of Purpuradusta fimbriata
- Cypraea friendii Gray, 1831: synonym of Zoila friendii
- Cypraea fultoni Sowerby, 1903: synonym of Barycypraea fultoni
- Cypraea fuscodentata: synonym of Cypraeovula fuscodentata
- Cypraea fuscorubra Shaw, 1909: synonym of Cypraeovula fuscorubra
- Cypraea gangranosa Dillwyn, 1817: synonym of Erosaria gangranosa
- Cypraea garciai Lorenz & Raines, 2001: synonym of Cribrarula garciai
- Cypraea gaskoini Reeve, 1846: synonym of Cribrarula gaskoini
- Cypraea gilvella Lorenz, 2002: synonym of Luria gilvella
- Cypraea globosa: synonym of Lyncina lynx
- Cypraea globulus Linnaeus, 1758: synonym of Pustularia globulus
- Cypraea goodalli Sowerby I, 1832: synonym of Bistolida goodallii
- Cypraea gracilis Gaskoin, 1849: synonym of Purpuradusta gracilis
- Cypraea granulata Pease, 1862: synonym of Nucleolaria granulata
- Cypraea grayana Schilder, 1930: synonym of Mauritia grayana
- Cypraea guttata Gmelin, 1791: synonym of Perisserosa guttata
- Cypraea hammondae Iredale, 1939: synonym of Purpuradusta hammondae
- Cypraea hartsmithi Schilder, 1967: synonym of Notocypraea hartsmithi
- Cypraea helvola Linnaeus, 1758: synonym of Erosaria helvola
- Cypraea hesitata Jousseaume, 1884: synonym of Umbilia hesitata
- Cypraea hirundo Linnaeus, 1758: synonym of Blasicrura hirundo
- Cypraea histrio Gmelin, 1791: synonym of Mauritia histrio
- Cypraea humphreysii Gray, 1825: synonym of Palmadusta humphreysii
- Cypraea hungerfordi lovetha Poppe, Tagaro & Buijse, 2005: synonym of Paradusta hungerfordi bealsi (Mock, 1996)
- Cypraea inocellata Gray is a synonym of Erosaria miliaris
- Cypraea interrupta Gray, 1824: synonym of Blasicrura interrupta
- Cypraea isabella Linnaeus, 1758: synonym of Luria isabella
- Cypraea kieneri Hidalgo, 1906: synonym of Bistolida kieneri
- Cypraea lamarckii Gray, 1825: synonym of Erosaria lamarckii
- Cypraea lentiginosa: synonym of Palmadusta lentiginosa
- Cypraea leucodon Broderip, 1828: synonym of Lyncina leucodon (Broderip, 1828)
- Cypraea leucodon leucodon Broderip, 1828: synonym of Lyncina leucodon (Broderip, 1828)
- Cypraea leviathan Schilder & Schilder, 1937: synonym of Lyncina leviathan
- Cypraea lisetae Kilburn, 1975: synonym of Nesiocypraea lisetae
- Cypraea limacina Lamarck, 1810: synonym of Staphylaea limacina
- Cypraea lurica: synonym of Erronea caurica
- Cypraea lurida Linnaeus: synonym of Luria lurida
- Cypraea lynx Linnaeus, 1758: synonym of Lyncina lynx
- Cypraea macandrewi Sowerby, 1870: synonym of Erosaria macandrewi
- Cypraea maculifera Schilder, 1932: synonym of Mauritia maculifera
- Cypraea madagascariensis Gmelin, 1790: synonym of Staphylaea nucleus madagascariensis
- Cypraea mappa Linnaeus, 1758: synonym of Leporicypraea mappa
- Cypraea margarita Dillwyn, 1817: synonym of Pustularia margarita
- Cypraea marginalis Dillwyn, 1827: synonym of Erosaria marginalis
- Cypraea mariae Schilder, 1927: synonym of Annepona mariae
- Cypraea mauiensis Burgess, 1967: synonym of Pustularia mauiensis
- Cypraea mauritiana Linnaeus, 1758: synonym of Mauritia mauritiana
- Cypraea microdon Gray, 1828: synonym of Purpuradusta microdon
- Cypraea miliaris Gmelin, 1790: synonym of Erosaria miliaris
- Cypraea minoridens Melvill, 1901: synonym of Purpuradusta minoridens
- Cypraea moneta Linnaeus, 1758: synonym of Monetaria moneta
- Cypraea mus Linnaeus, 1758: synonym of Muracypraea mus
- Cypraea nebrites Melvill, 1888: synonym of Erosaria nebrites
- Cypraea nigropunctata Gray, 1828: synonym of Pseudozonaria nigropunctata
- Cypraea nivosa Broderip, 1827: synonym of Lyncina nivosa
- Cypraea nucleus Linnaeus, 1758: synonym of Staphylaea nucleus
- Cypraea ocellata L.: synonym of Erosaria ocellata
- Cypraea oniscus Lamarck, 1810: synonym of Triviella aperta (Swainson, 1822)
- Cypraea onyx Linnaeus, 1758: synonym of Erronea onyx
- Cypraea owenii Sowerby, 1837: synonym of Bistolida owenii
- Cypraea ovum Gmelin 1791 (synonym of Erronea ovum
- Cypraea pallida: synonym of Erronea pallida
- Cypraea pallidula (Gaskoin, 1849): synonym of Blasicrura pallidula
- Cypraea pediculus var. cimex G. B. Sowerby II, 1870: synonym of Pusula cimex (G. B. Sowerby II, 1870)
- Cypraea picta Gray, 1824: synonym of Zonaria picta
- Cypraea piperita Gray, 1825: synonym of Notocypraea piperita
- Cypraea poraria Linnaeus, 1758: synonym of Erosaria poraria
- Cypraea propinqua Garrett, 1879: synonym of Lyncina carneola
- Cypraea pulchra Gray, 1824: synonym of Luria pulchra
- Cypraea pulchella Swainson, 1823: synonym of Contradusta pulchella
- Cypraea punctata Linnaeus, 1771: synonym of Ransoniella punctata
- Cypraea pyriformis Gray, 1824 (synonym of Erronea pyriformis
- Cypraea pyrum Gmelin, 1791 (synonym of Zonaria pyrum
- Cypraea reticulata Martyn, 1784: synonym of Mauritia histrio
- Cypraea robertsi Hidalgo, 1906: synonym of Pseudozonaria robertsi
- Cypraea sakuraii (Habe, 1970): synonym of Austrasiatica sakuraii (Habe, 1970)
- Cypraea schilderorum Iredale, 1939: synonym of Lyncina schilderorum
- Cypraea scurra Gmelin, 1791: synonym of Mauritia scurra
- Cypraea solandri G. B. Sowerby I, 1832: synonym of Pusula solandri (G. B. Sowerby I, 1832)
- Cypraea spadicea Swainson, 1823: synonym of Neobernaya spadicea
- Cypraea spurca Linnaeus, 1758: synonym of Erosaria spurca
- Cypraea staphylaea Linnaeus, 1758: synonym of Staphylaea staphylaea
- Cypraea stercoraria Linnaeus: synonym of Trona stercoraria
- Cypraea stolida Linnaeus, 1758: synonym of Bistolida stolida
- Cypraea subviridis Reeve, 1835: synonym of Erronea subviridis (Reeve, 1835)
- Cypraea sulcidentata Gray, 1824): synonym of Lyncina sulcidentata
- Cypraea surinamensis G. Perry, 1811: synonym of Propustularia surinamensis
- Cypraea talpa Linnaeus, 1758: synonym of Talparia talpa
- Cypraea teres Gmelin, 1791: synonym of Blasicrura teres
- Cypraea tessellata Swainson, 1822: synonym of Luria tessellata
- Cypraea testudinaria Linnaeus, 1758: synonym of Chelycypraea testudinaria
- Cypraea teuleri Cazenavette, 1845: synonym of Bernaya teulerei
- Cypraea thomasi Crosse, 1865: synonym of Erosaria thomasi
- Cypraea turdus Lamarck, 1810: synonym of Erosaria turdus
- Cypraea umbilicata G.B. Sowerby I, 1825: synonym of Umbilia hesitata (Iredale, 1916)
- Cypraea ursellus Gmelin, 1791: synonym of Bistolida ursellus
- Cypraea ventriculus Lamarck, 1810: synonym of Lyncina ventriculus
- Cypraea venusta Sowerby, 1847: synonym of Zoila venusta
- Cypraea verhoefi Burgess, 1982: synonym of Cypraeovula castanea (Higgins, 1868)
- Cypraea vitellus Linnaeus, 1758: synonym of Lyncina vitellus
- Cypraea vredenburgi Schilder, 1927: synonym of Erronea vredenburgi
- Cypraea walkeri Sowerby, 1832: synonym of Contradusta walkeri
- Cypraea xanthodon Sowerby I, 1832: synonym of Erronea xanthodon
- Cypraea zebra Linnaeus, 1758: synonym of Macrocypraea zebra
- Cypraea ziczac Linnaeus, 1758: synonym of Palmadusta ziczac
- Cypraea zonaria Gmelin: synonym of Zonaria zonaria
