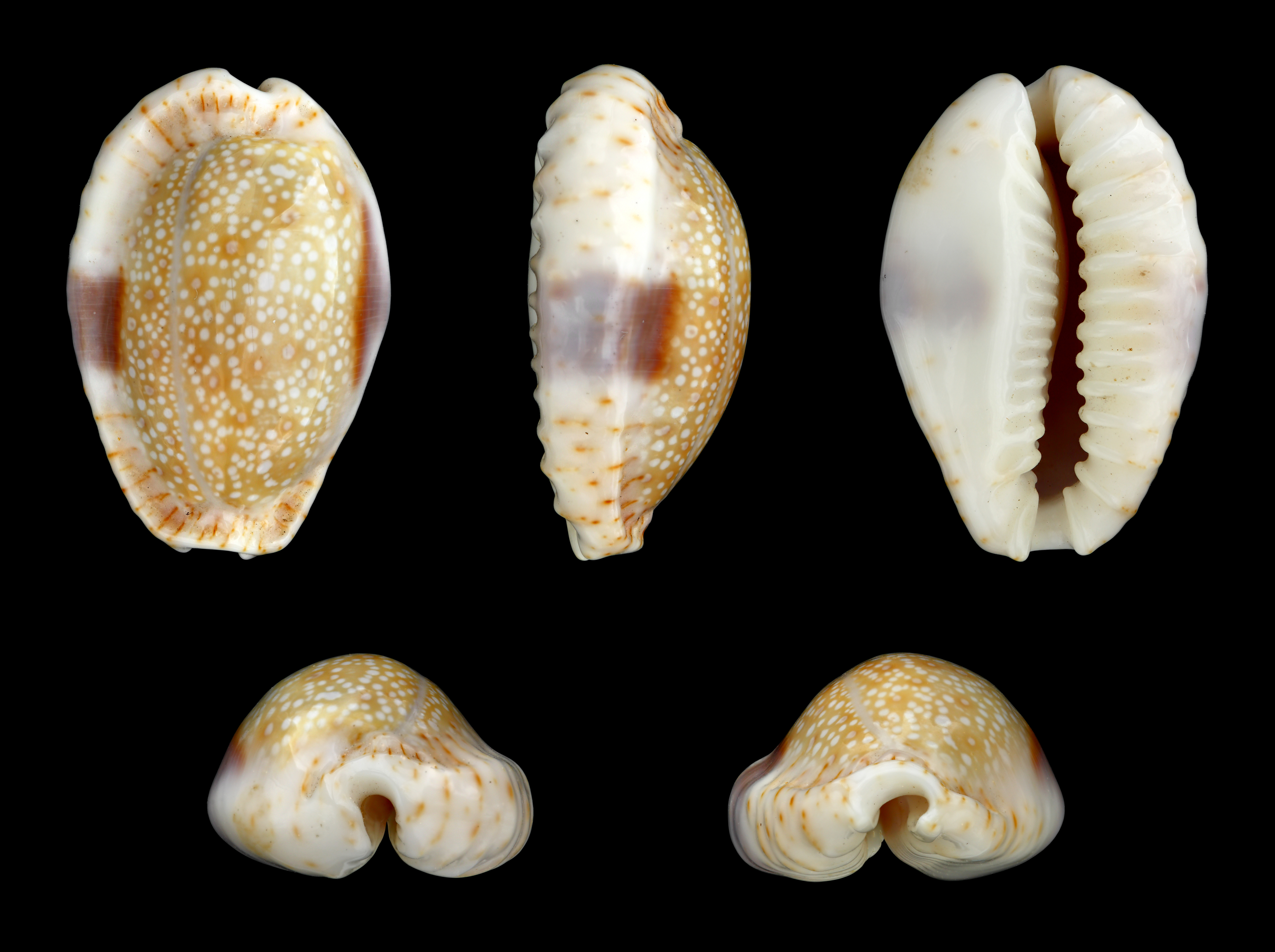
- Five views of a shell of Naria erosa chlorizans

Scientific classification
- Kingdom: Animalia
- Phylum: Mollusca
- Class: Gastropoda
- Subclass: Caenogastropoda
- Order: Littorinimorpha
- Superfamily: Cypraeoidea
- Family: Cypraeidae
- Genus: Naria; Gray, 1837

Type species
- Naria irrorata (Gray, 1828)

Synonyms
- Albacypraea Steadman & Cotton, 1946; Aricia (Erosaria) Troschel, 1863; Brugnonia Jeffreys, 1883; Cupinota Iredale, 1939; Cypraea (Erosaria) Troschel, 1863; Cypraea (Naria) Gray, 1837; Cypraea (Ocellaria) Weinkauff, 1881 (invalid: junior homonym of Ocellaria Ramond, 1801 [Porifera]); Erosaria Troschel, 1863; Erosaria (Erosaria) Troschel, 1863; Erosaria (Ocellaria) Weinkauff, 1881; Paulonaria Iredale, 1930

= Naria (gastropod) =

Genus of gastropods

Naria is a genus of sea snails, cowries, marine gastropod mollusks in the subfamily Erosariinae of the family Cypraeidae, the cowries.

== Species ==
Species within the genus Naria include:

- Naria acicularis (Gmelin, 1791)
- † Naria agassizi (Ladd, 1934)
- Naria albuginosa (Gray, 1825)
- Naria beckii (Gaskoin, 1836)
- Naria bernardi (Richard, 1974)
- † Naria bezoyensis (Dolin & Lozouet, 2004)
- Naria boivinii (Kiener, 1843)
- Naria cernica (G.B. Sowerby II, 1870)
- Naria citrina (Gray, 1825)
- Naria eburnea Barnes, 1924
- Naria englerti (Summers & Burgess, 1965)
- Naria erosa (Linnaeus, 1758)
- † Naria everwijni (K. Martin, 1884)
- Naria franzhuberi Thach, 2020
- Naria gangranosa (Dillwyn, 1817)
- Naria helvola (Linnaeus, 1758)
- Naria irrorata (Gray, 1828), the type species
- Naria labrolineata (Gaskoin, 1849)
- Naria lamarckii (Gray, 1825)
- Naria macandrewi (G.B. Sowerby II, 1870)
- Naria marginalis (Dillwyn, 1817)
- Naria miliaris (Gmelin, 1791)
- Naria nebrites (Melvill, 1888)
- Naria ocellata (Linnaeus, 1758)
- Naria ostergaardi (Dall, 1921)
- Naria poraria (Linnaeus, 1758)
- † Naria praehelvola Fehse & Vicián, 2021
- Naria spurca (Linnaeus, 1758)
- Naria thomasi (Crosse, 1865)
- Naria turdus (Lamarck, 1810)
