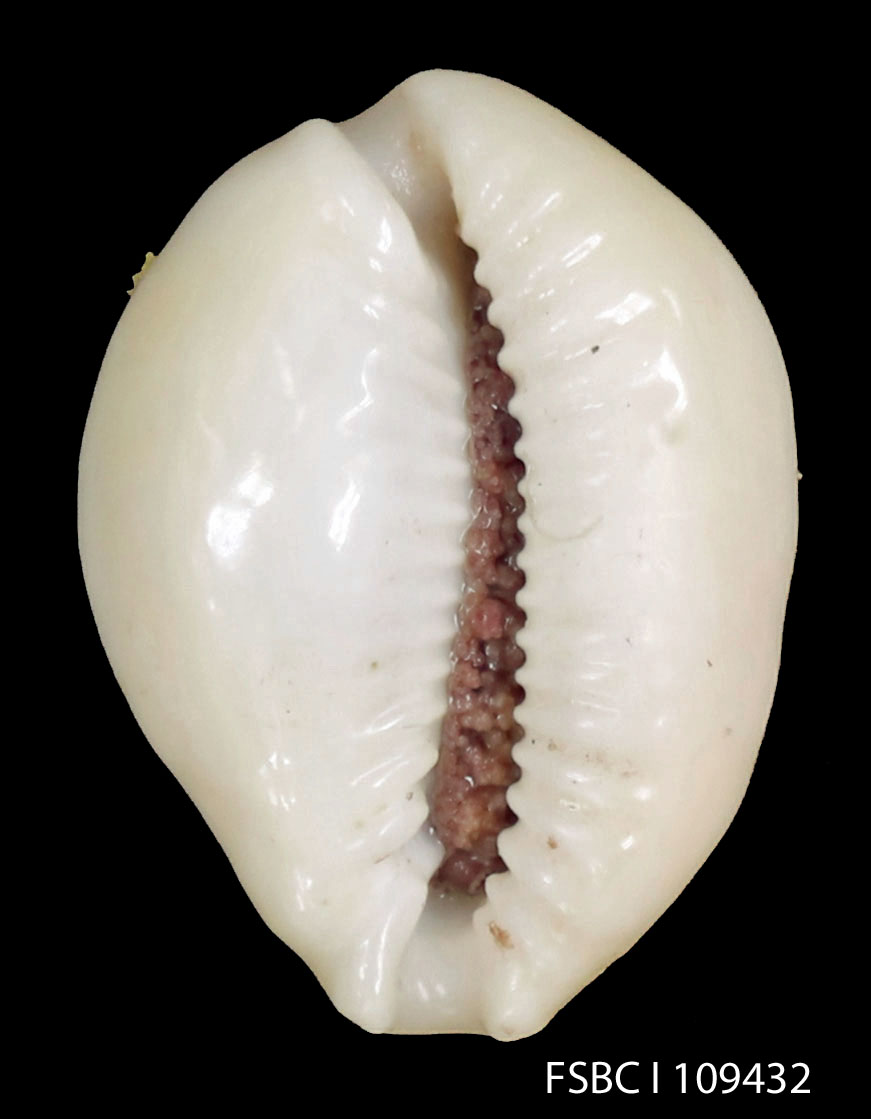
- Naria acicularis shell

Scientific classification
- Kingdom: Animalia
- Phylum: Mollusca
- Class: Gastropoda
- Subclass: Caenogastropoda
- Order: Littorinimorpha
- Family: Cypraeidae
- Genus: Naria
- Species: N. acicularis

Binomial name
- Naria acicularis (Gmelin, 1791)

Synonyms
- Cypraea lunata Fischer von Waldheim, 1807; Erosaria acicularis (Gmelin, 1791); Erosaria nitidiuscula Coen, G.S., 1949; Erosaria nitiduscula Coen, G.S., 1949

= Naria acicularis =

Species of gastropod

Naria acicularis, common name the Atlantic yellow cowry, is a species of cowry, a sea snail, a marine gastropod mollusk in the family Cypraeidae, the cowries.

== Forms ==
Although they are of no taxonomic significance, there are two named forms of this species: form algoensis and form sanctaehelenae (Schilder, F.A., 1930).

== Distribution ==
This species occurs on the coasts of North Carolina, USA, the Gulf of Mexico, the Caribbean, Venezuela, Colombia and Brazil.

== Description ==
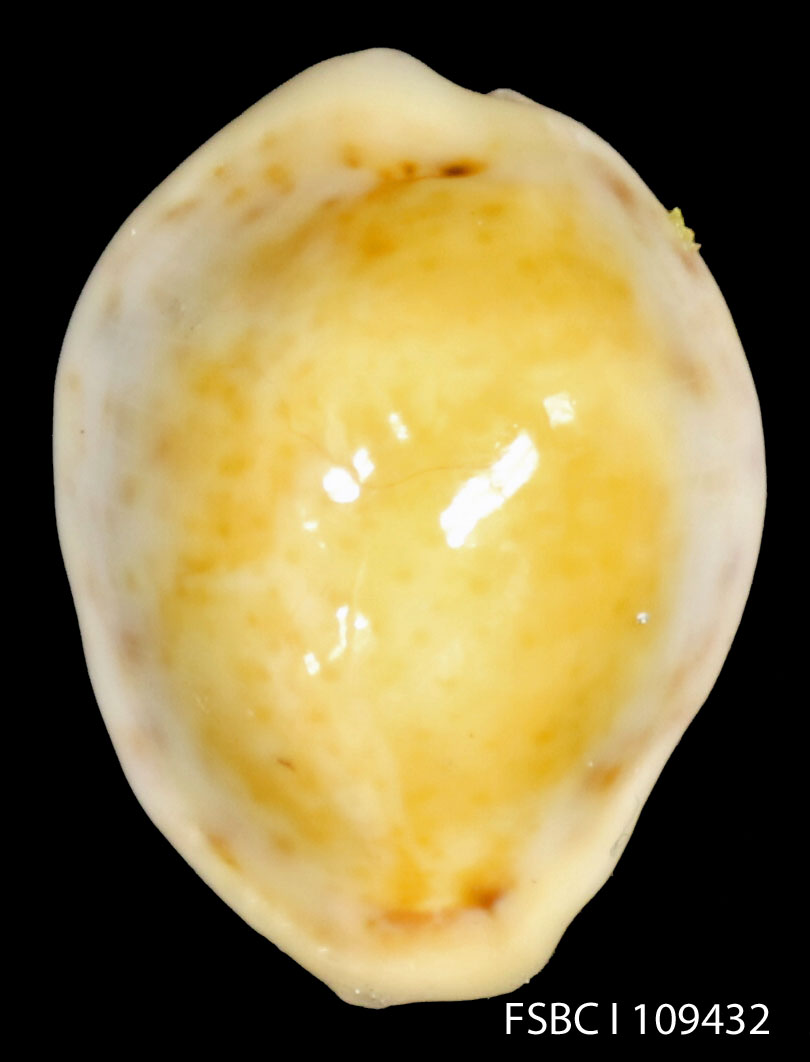
Dorsal view of the shell of Naria acicularis.

The maximum recorded adult shell length for this species is 31 mm.

== Habitat ==
The minimum recorded depth for this species is 0 m; maximum recorded depth is 780 m.
