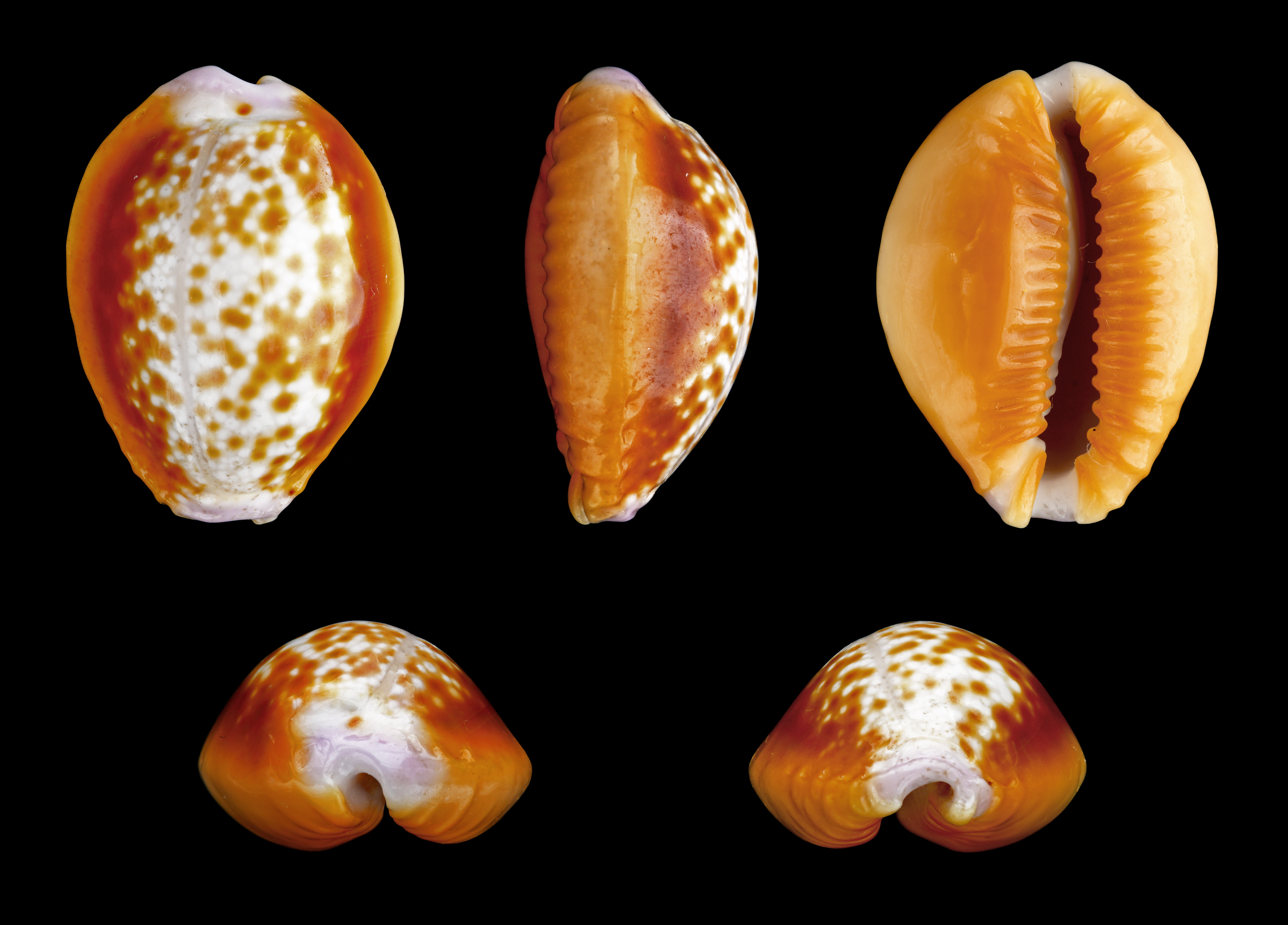
- Five views of a shell of Naria helvola
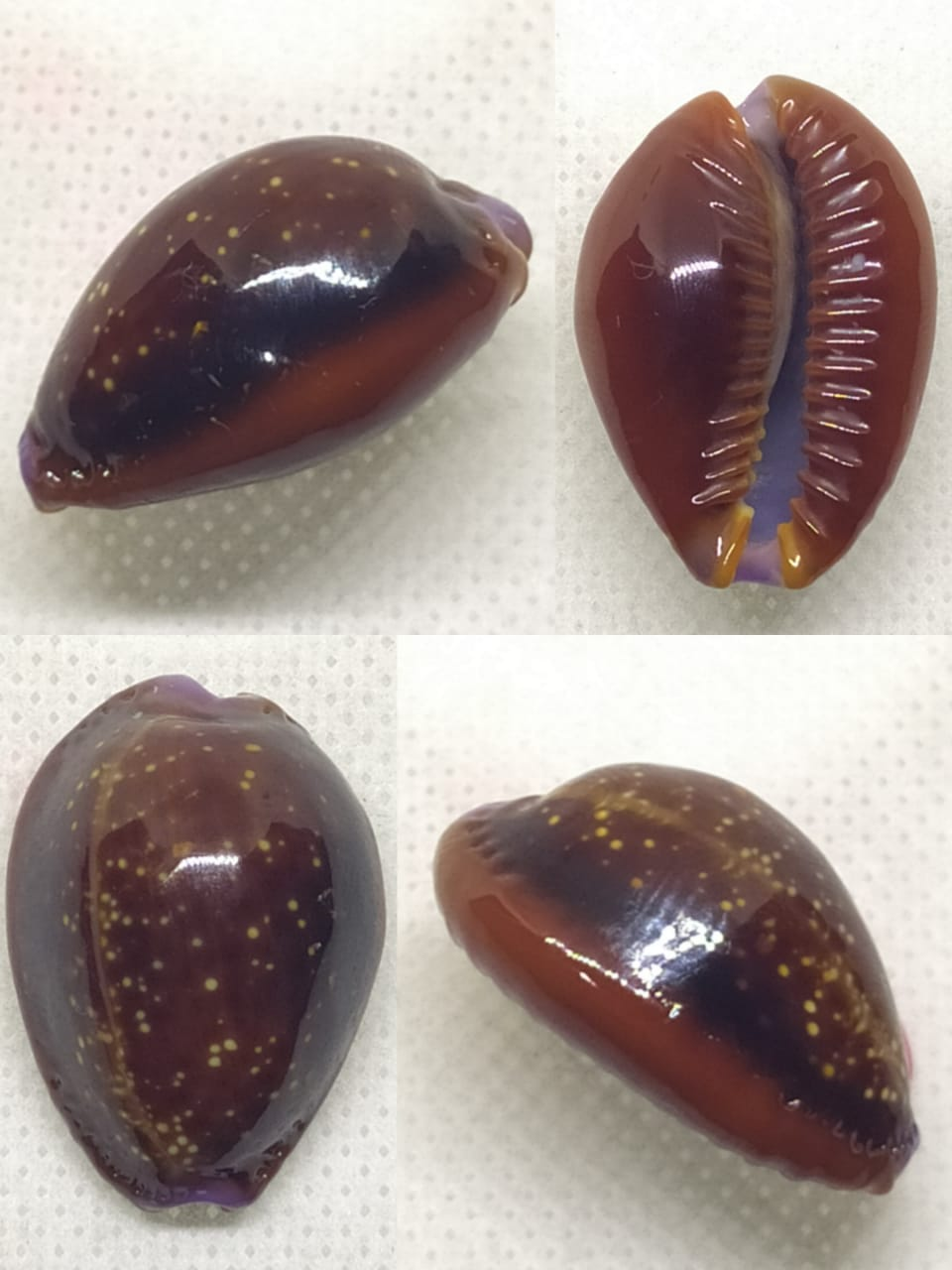
- Specimen from Mlandingan Situbondo, East Java

Scientific classification
- Kingdom: Animalia
- Phylum: Mollusca
- Class: Gastropoda
- Subclass: Caenogastropoda
- Order: Littorinimorpha
- Family: Cypraeidae
- Subfamily: Erosariinae
- Genus: Naria
- Species: N. helvola

Binomial name
- Naria helvola (Linnaeus, 1758)

Synonyms
- Cypraea helvola Linnaeus, 1758 (basionym); Erosaria helvola (Linnaeus, 1758)

= Naria helvola =

Species of gastropod

Naria helvola, common name: the honey cowry, is a species of sea snail, a cowry, a marine gastropod mollusk in the family Cypraeidae, the cowries.

There are three subspecies:

- Naria helvola bellatrix (Lorenz, 2009)
- Naria helvola hawaiiensis (Melvill, 1888)
- Naria helvola helvola (Linnaeus, 1758)
- Naria helvola meridionalis (Schilder & Schilder, 1938): synonym of Naria helvola helvola (Linnaeus, 1758)
- Naria helvola var. callista (Shaw, 1909): synonym of Naria helvola helvola (Linnaeus, 1758)

== Description ==
These very common small shells reach on average 15–23 millimetres (0.59–0.91 in) of length, with a maximum size of 36 millimetres (1.4 in) and a minimum size of 8 millimetres (0.31 in). The basic color of the shell is orange-brown or beige, with many white dots on the top of the dorsum. The underside is orange-brown. In the living cowries the mantle is transparent, with short white papillae.

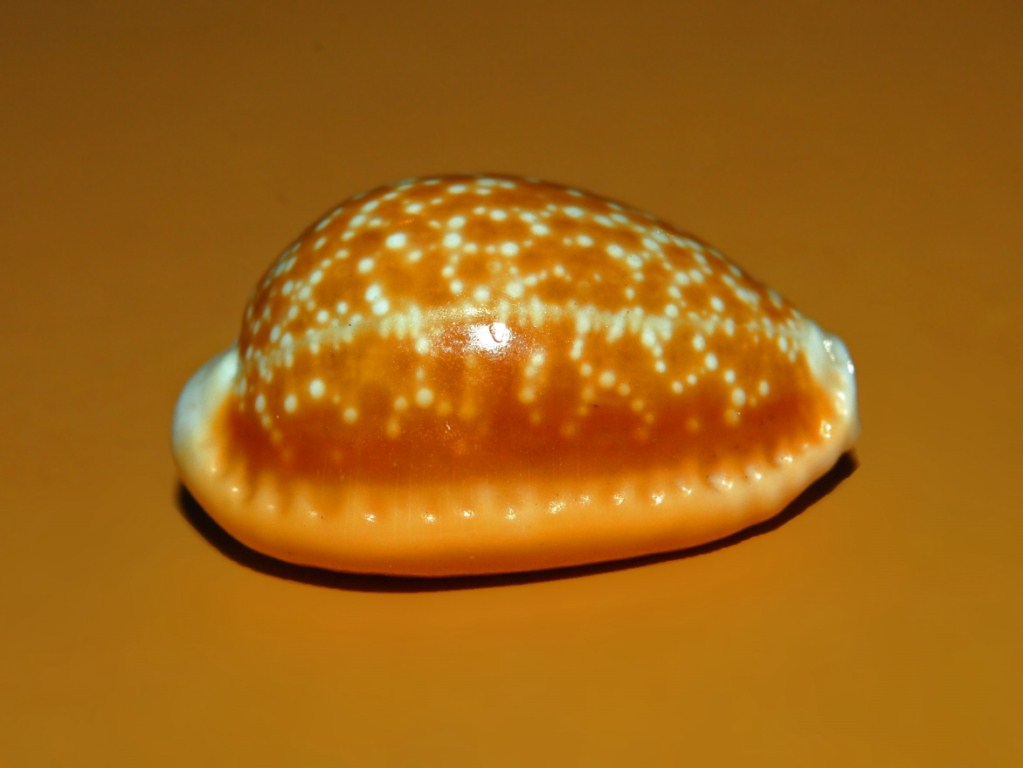
Naria helvola, lateral view, anterior end towards the right

== Distribution ==
This species occurs throughout the Indo-Pacific, along the Red Sea, Aldabra, Chagos, the Comores, the East Coast of South Africa, Kenya, Madagascar, the Mascarene Basin, Mauritius, Mozambique, Réunion, the Seychelles, Somalia, Tanzania, Polynesia and Hawaii.

== Habitat ==
Naria helvola lives in intertidal and shallow subtidal waters or in lagoons, usually hiding during the day under the rocks of the reef.
