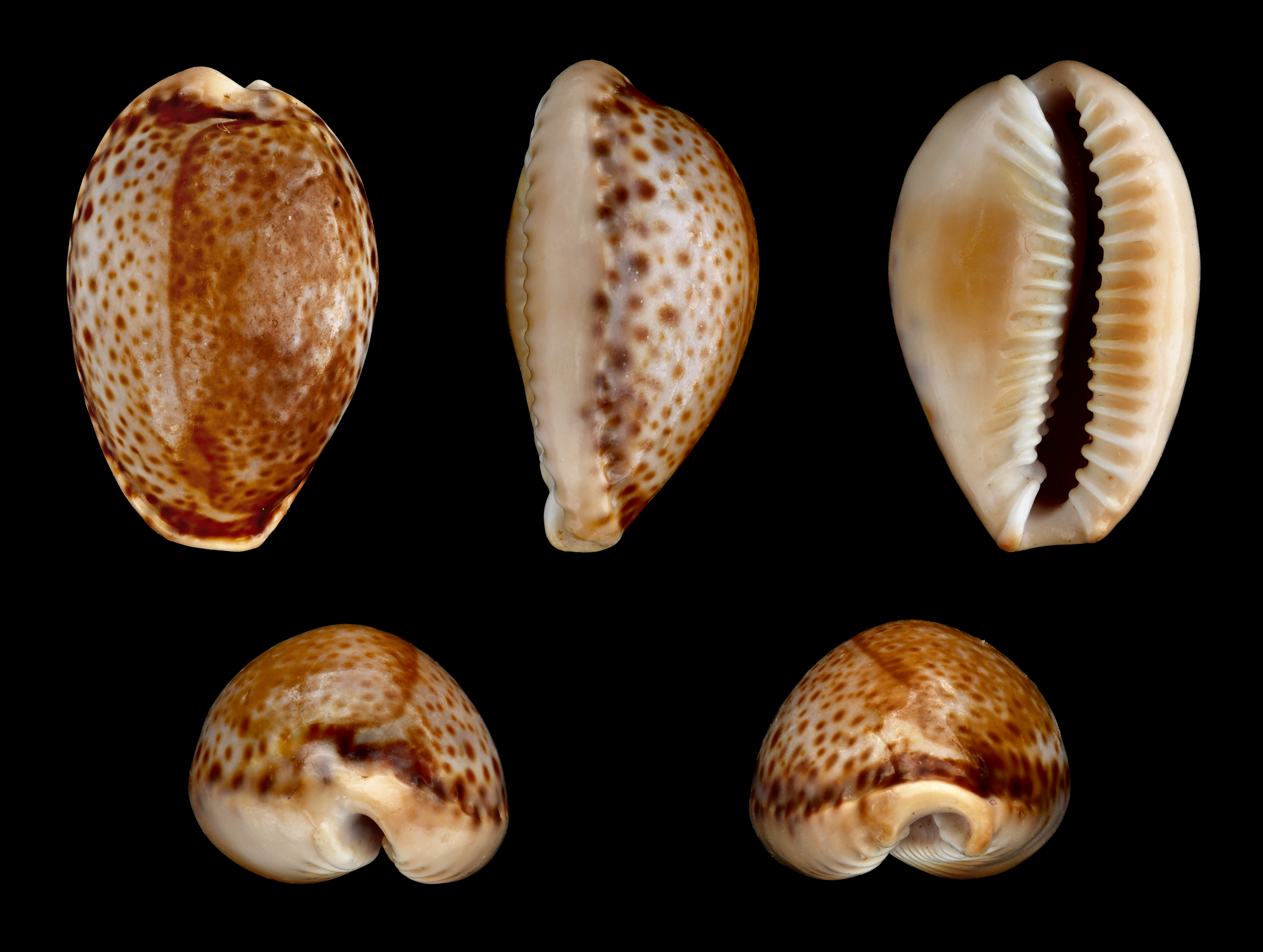
- A shell of Naria spurca

Scientific classification
- Kingdom: Animalia
- Phylum: Mollusca
- Class: Gastropoda
- Subclass: Caenogastropoda
- Order: Littorinimorpha
- Family: Cypraeidae
- Genus: Naria
- Species: N. spurca

Binomial name
- Naria spurca (Linnaeus, 1758)

Synonyms
- Cypraea spurca Linnaeus, 1758; Erosaria spurca (Linnaeus, 1758)

= Naria spurca =

Species of gastropod

Naria spurca, common name the dirty cowry, is a species of sea snail, a cowry, a marine gastropod mollusk in the family Cypraeidae, the cowries.

== Description ==
The shells of these very common cowries reach on average 23–28 millimetres (0.91–1.10 in) of length, with a minimum size of 12 millimetres (0.47 in) and a maximum size of 39 millimetres (1.5 in). They are very variable in pattern and colour. The surface is smooth and shiny, the dorsum basic color is whitish or yellowish, with a variegated orange-brown, yellow ocher or reddish indistinct spotting on the dorsum. The yellowish margins are crenulated or bordered by a series of dimples. The base is whitish or cream, sometimes with shades of orange and some dark spots near the edge, while the teeth are usually large and white. In the living cowries the mantle is greyish, with quite long tree-shaped sensorial papillae.

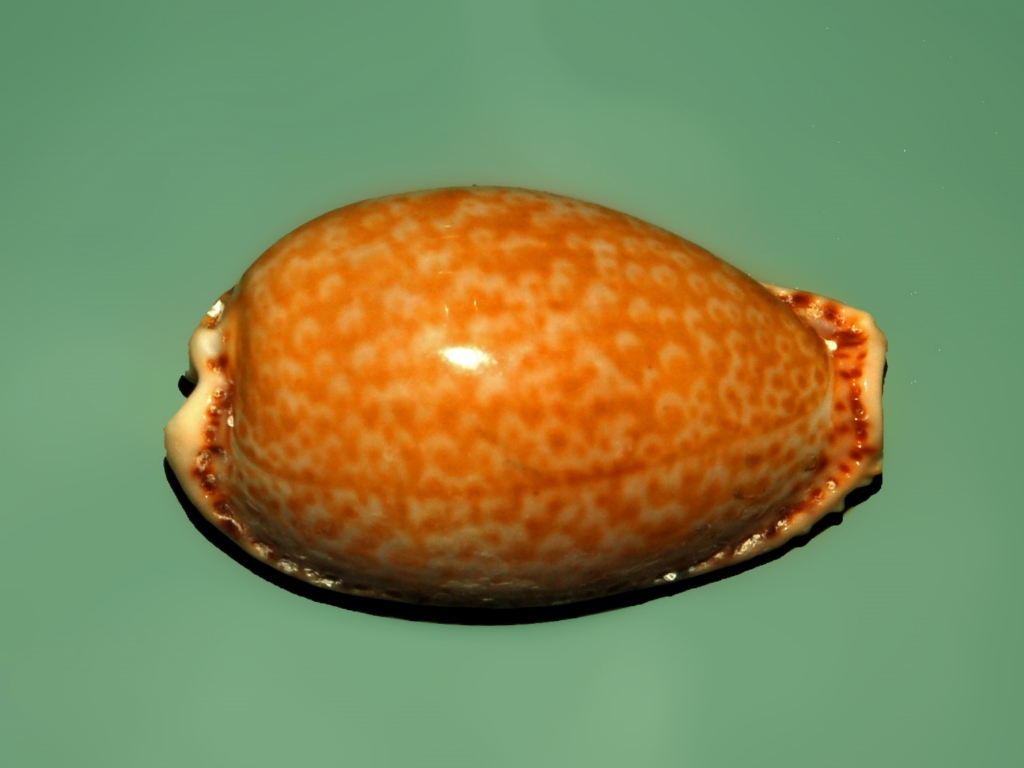
Shell of Naria spurca from Lampedusa Island

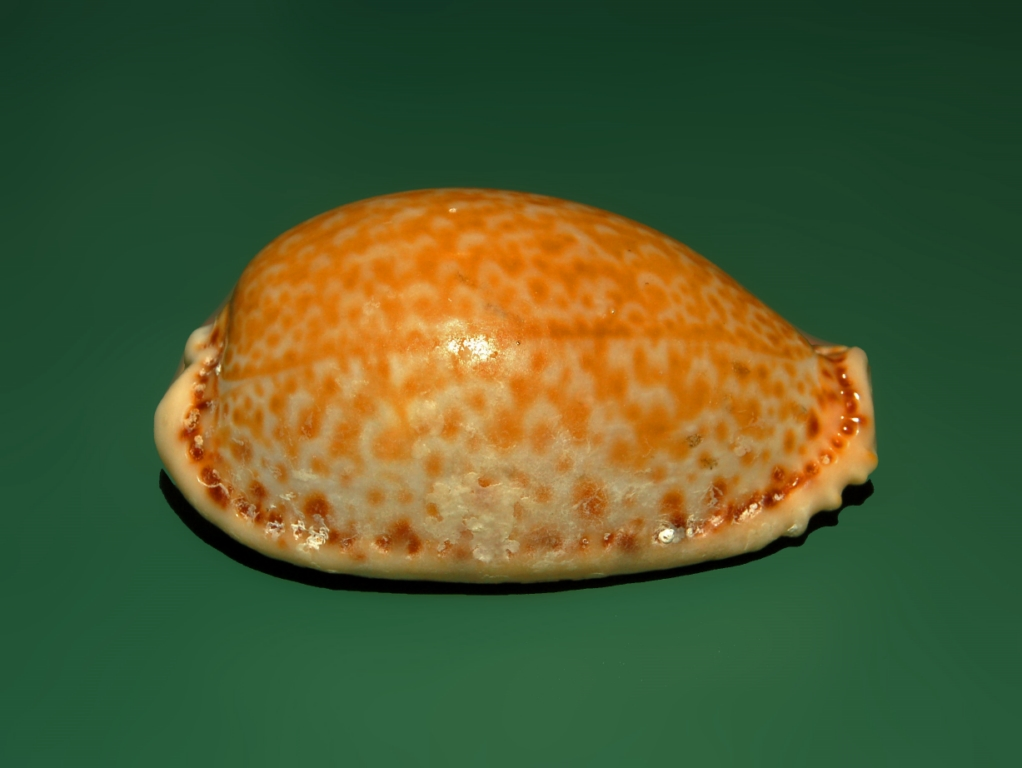
Shell of Naria spurca from Lampedusa Island, lateral view

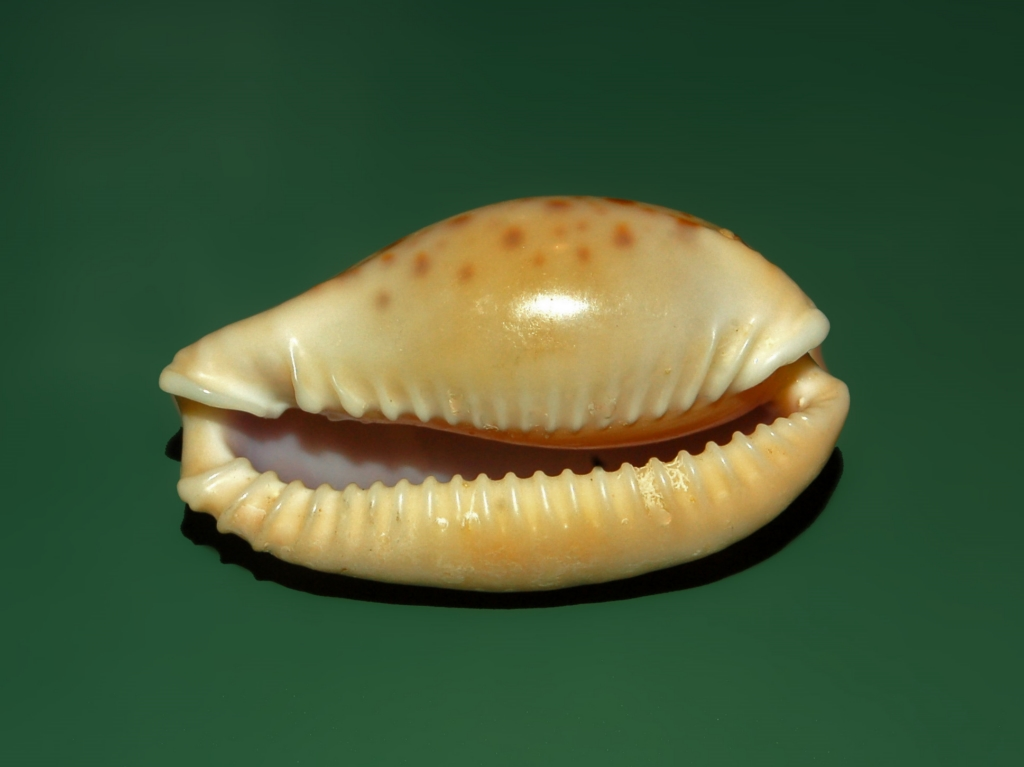
Shell of Naria spurca from Lampedusa Island, apertural view

== Distribution ==
Naria spurca occurs in the central and southern Mediterranean Sea (southern Italy, Crete, Malta, Lampedusa Island, etc.), in the Red Sea (introduced) and in the eastern Atlantic Ocean along the West African coast (from Morocco to Angola, including Ascension Island, Canaries and Cape Verde Islands).

== Habitat ==
These cowries commonly live at 2–20 metres (6 ft 7 in – 65 ft 7 in) of depth, but they can also be found in deeper waters up to 50 metres (160 ft). During the day they are usually hidden under rocks, in crevices or in underwater meadows of Posidonia oceanica, as they start feeding at dusk.

== Subspecies ==
- Naria spurca sanctaehelenae (Schilder, 1930)
- Naria spurca spurca (Linnaeus, 1758)
- Naria spurca verdensium Melvill, 1888
