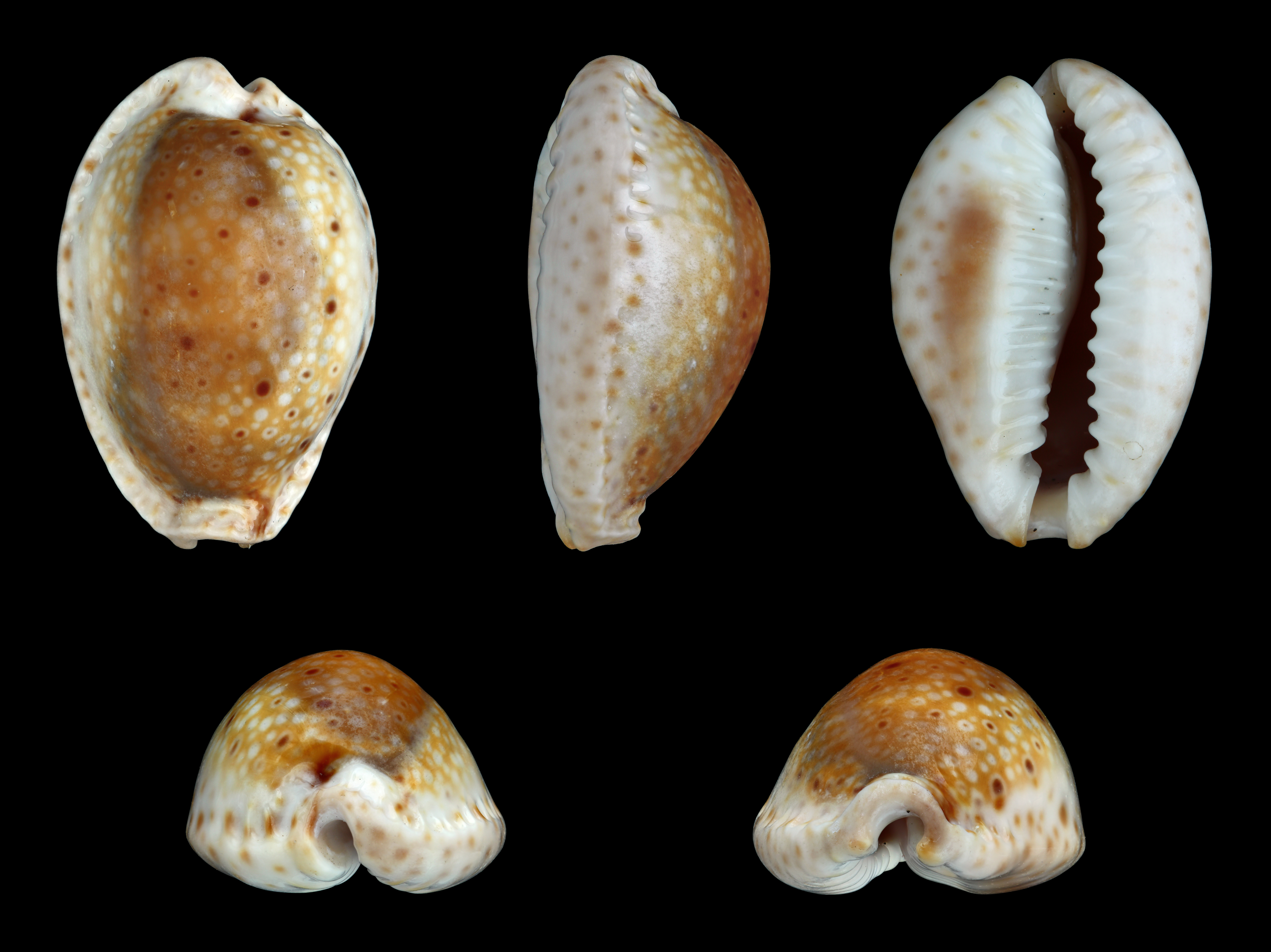
- Five views of a shell of Naria ocellata
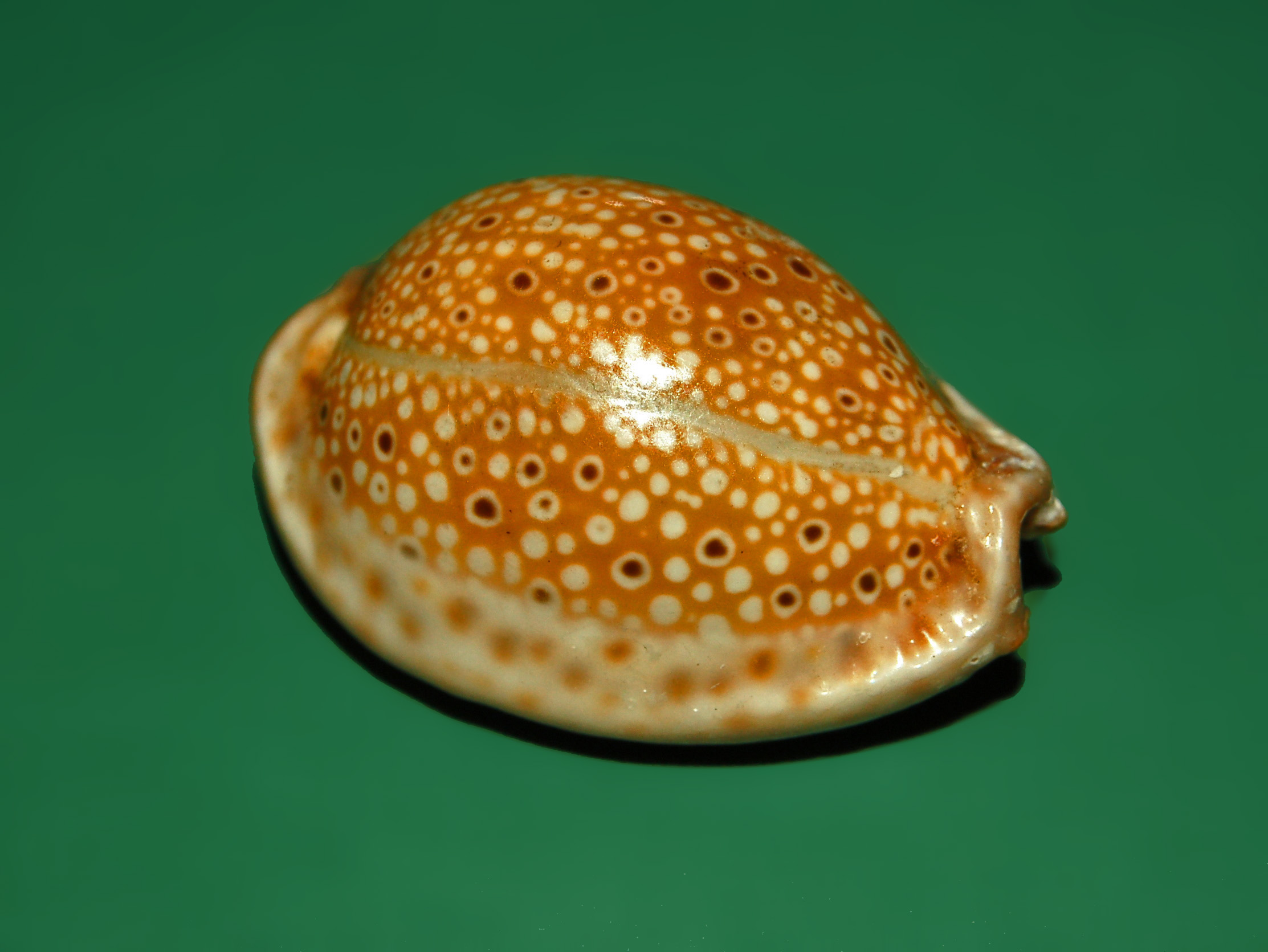
- A shell of Naria ocellata, anterior end towards the right

Scientific classification
- Kingdom: Animalia
- Phylum: Mollusca
- Class: Gastropoda
- Subclass: Caenogastropoda
- Order: Littorinimorpha
- Family: Cypraeidae
- Genus: Naria
- Species: N. ocellata

Binomial name
- Naria ocellata (Linnaeus, 1758)

Synonyms
- Cypraea ocellata Linnaeus, 1758 (basionym); Cypraea brunnea Gray, J.E., 1825; Cypraea calopthalma Melvill, J.C., 1888; Cypraea palatha Melvill, J.C., 1888; Cypraea pelidna Melvill, J.C., 1888; Cypraea pretiosa Melvill, J.C., 1905; Erosaria ocellata (Linnaeus, 1758)

= Naria ocellata =

Species of gastropod

Naria ocellata, common name the ocellate cowry, is a species of sea snail, a cowry, a marine gastropod mollusk in the family Cypraeidae, the cowries.

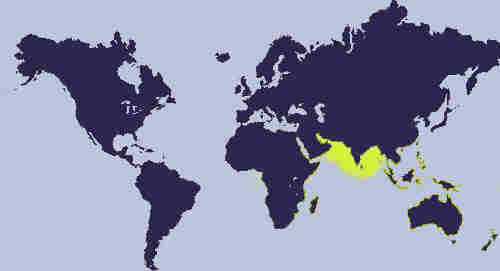
Distribution map of Naria ocellata

== Description ==
The shells of these quite uncommon cowries reach on average 25–30 millimetres (0.98–1.18 in) of length, with a minimum size of 14 millimetres (0.55 in) and a maximum size of 57 millimetres (2.2 in). They are oval and have a medium thickness. The dorsum surface of these smooth and shiny shells has generally a fawn or cream color and it is spread with numerous white spots, a few of them with a black centre (hence the Latin name ocellata meaning "eyed"). The base is whitish and often has a brown blotch, while the pronounced margins show various fawn spots on a pale background. In the living cowries mantle and foot are well developed.

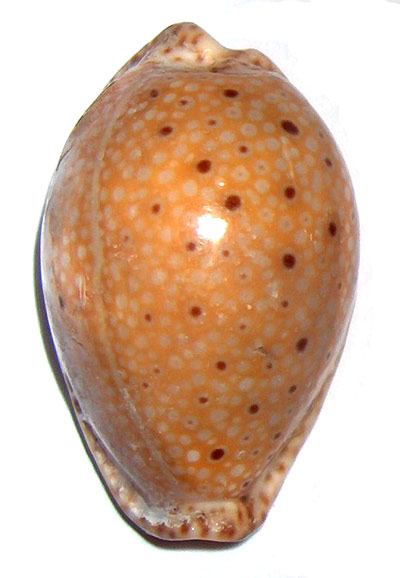
Dorsal view of a shell of Naria ocellata

== Distribution ==
This species occurs in the northern Indian Ocean (see range map) on the coasts of Mozambique, Persian Gulf, Gulf of Oman, southern India, Maldives, Sri Lanka, up to Thailand, southern Java and Melanesia.

== Habitat ==
Naria ocellata lives in tropical and subtropical zones, from shallow intertidal water up to 0–90 metres (0–295 ft) depth, feeding on algae or coral polyps.
