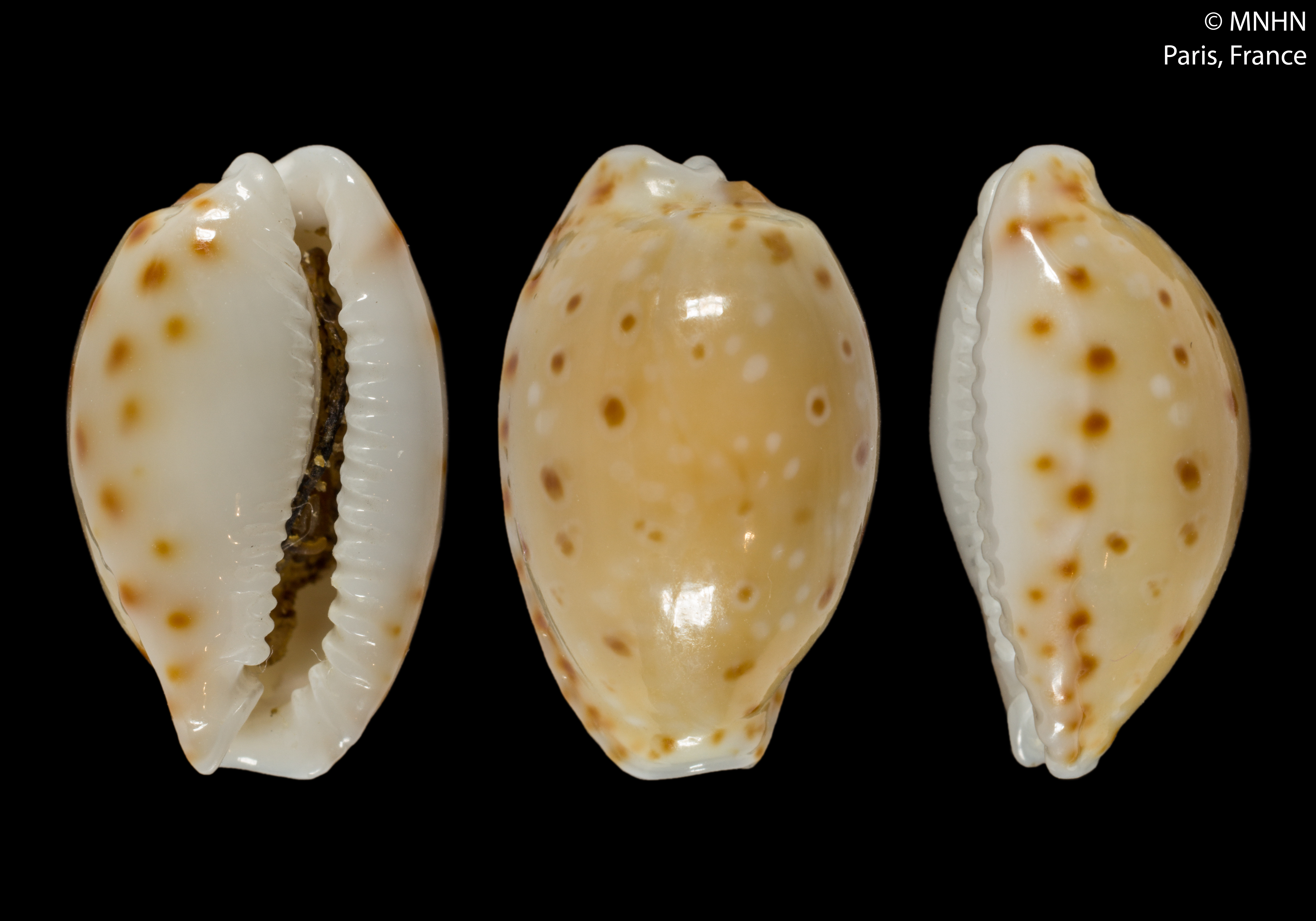
- Shell of Naria thomasi (holotype at MNHN, Paris)

Scientific classification
- Kingdom: Animalia
- Phylum: Mollusca
- Class: Gastropoda
- Subclass: Caenogastropoda
- Order: Littorinimorpha
- Family: Cypraeidae
- Subfamily: Erosariinae
- Genus: Naria
- Species: N. thomasi

Binomial name
- Naria thomasi (Crosse, 1865)

Synonyms
- Cypraea philmarti Poppe, 1993; Cypraea thomasi Crosse, 1865 (basionym); Erosaria thomasi (Crosse, 1865)

= Naria thomasi =

Species of gastropod

Naria thomasi is a species of sea snail, a cowry, a marine gastropod mollusk in the family Cypraeidae, the cowries.

== Description ==
The shell size varies between 10 mm and 24 mm.

== Distribution ==
This species occurs in the Red Sea, in the Indian Ocean along Eritrea and Somalia and in the Pacific along the Marquesas.
