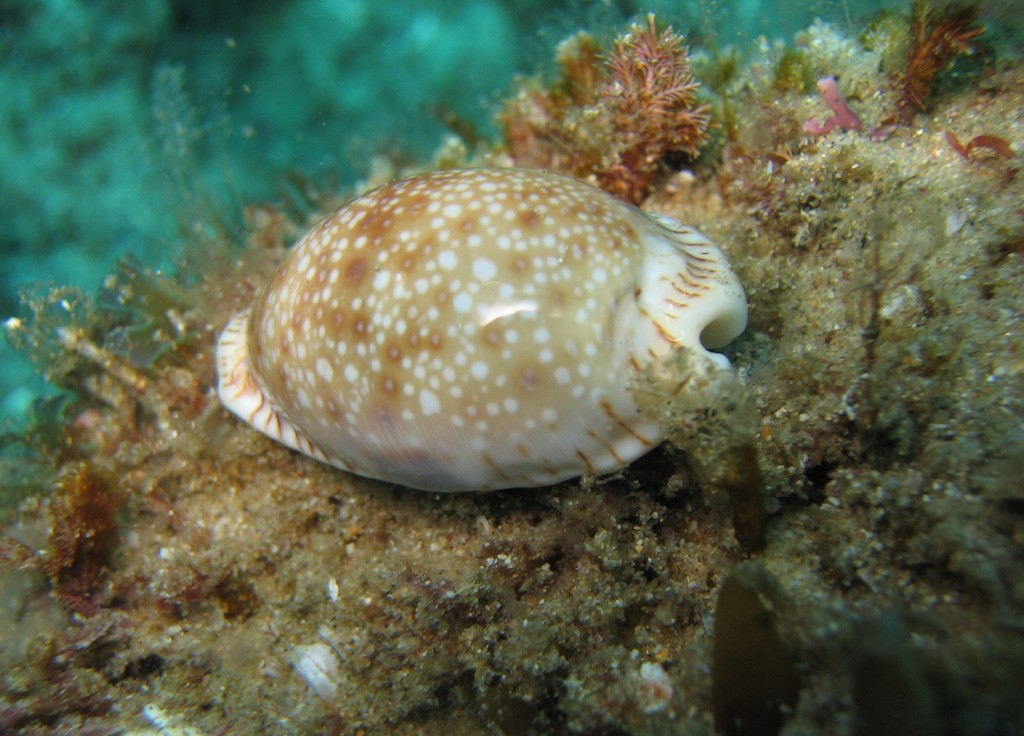
- Naria erosa, anterior end is to the left

Scientific classification
- Kingdom: Animalia
- Phylum: Mollusca
- Class: Gastropoda
- Subclass: Caenogastropoda
- Order: Littorinimorpha
- Family: Cypraeidae
- Subfamily: Erosariinae
- Genus: Naria
- Species: N. erosa

Binomial name
- Naria erosa (Linnaeus, 1758)

Synonyms
- Cypraea (Luponia) erosa Linnaeus, 1758; Cypraea erosa Linnaeus, 1758 (basionym); Cypraea flavicula Lamarck, 1810; Erosaria erosa (Linnaeus, 1758)

= Naria erosa =

Species of gastropod

Naria erosa, common name the gnawed or eroded cowry, is a species of sea snail, a cowry, a marine gastropod mollusk in the family Cypraeidae, the cowries.

Subspecies

- Naria erosa chlorizans (Melvill, 1888)
- Naria erosa erosa (Linnaeus, 1758)

== Description ==
The shell of these quite common cowries reaches on average 32–38 millimetres (1.3–1.5 in) in length, with a maximum size of 75 millimetres (3.0 in) and a minimum adult size of 15 millimetres (0.59 in). The dorsum is yellow-ocher or pale brown, with many small white spots. The extremities of the shell show dark brown spots. A dark brown area which is roughly rectangular is present on each side close to the edge. The base is white to light beige, with thin transverse stripes.

At night in the living cowries, the extremely papillose brownish mantle usually covers the shell completely, camouflaging the animal.

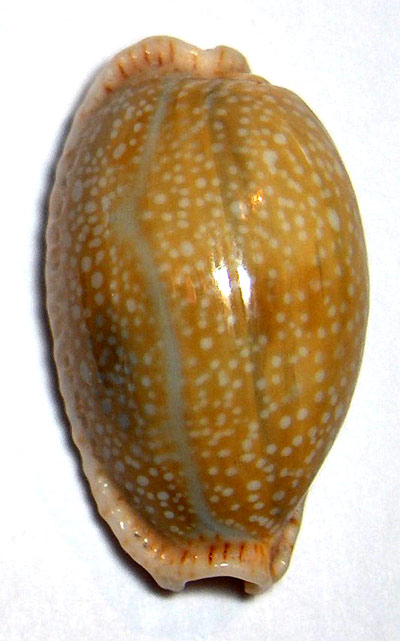
Naria erosa, dorsal view

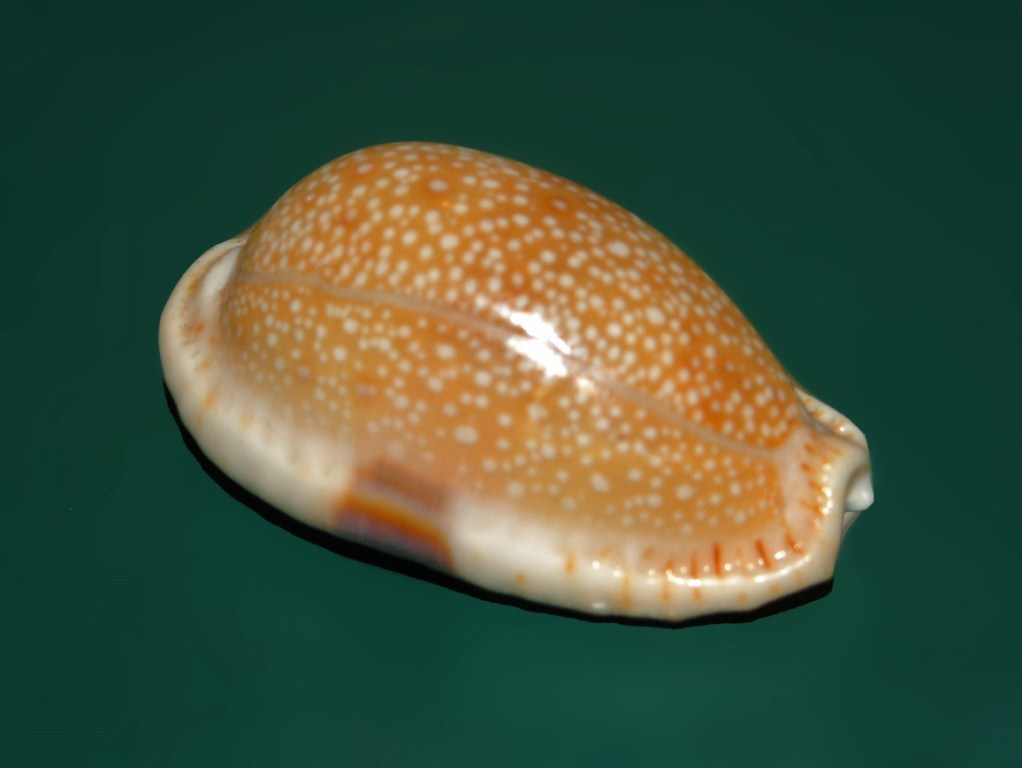
Naria erosa chlorizans, anterior end towards the right - Australia

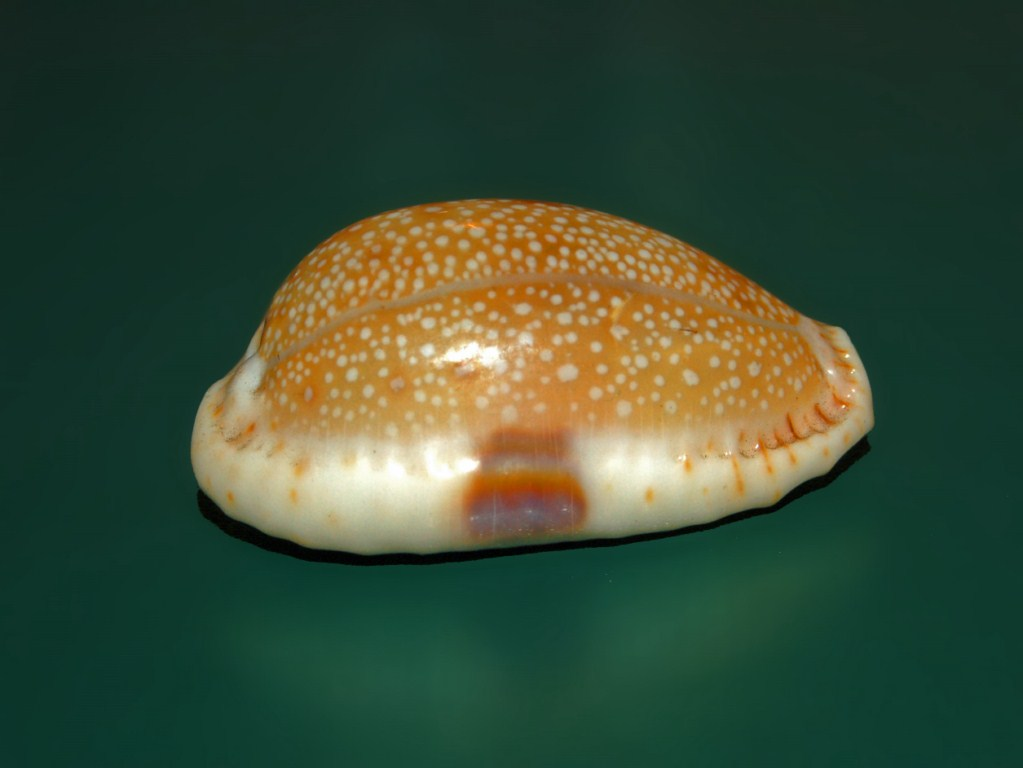
Naria erosa chlorizans side view, anterior end towards the right

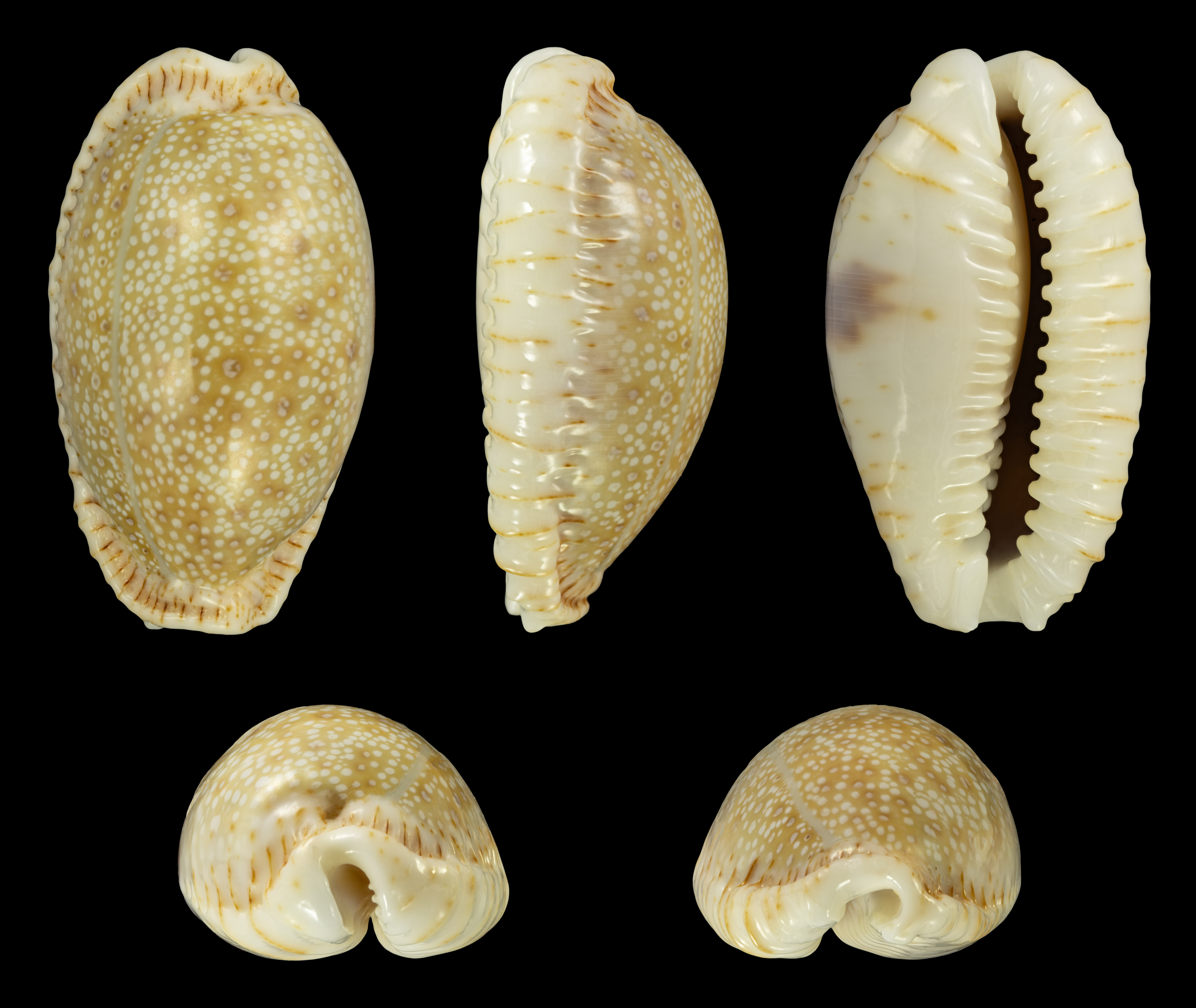
Naria erosa erosa var. phagedaina

Naria erosa erosa var. straminea

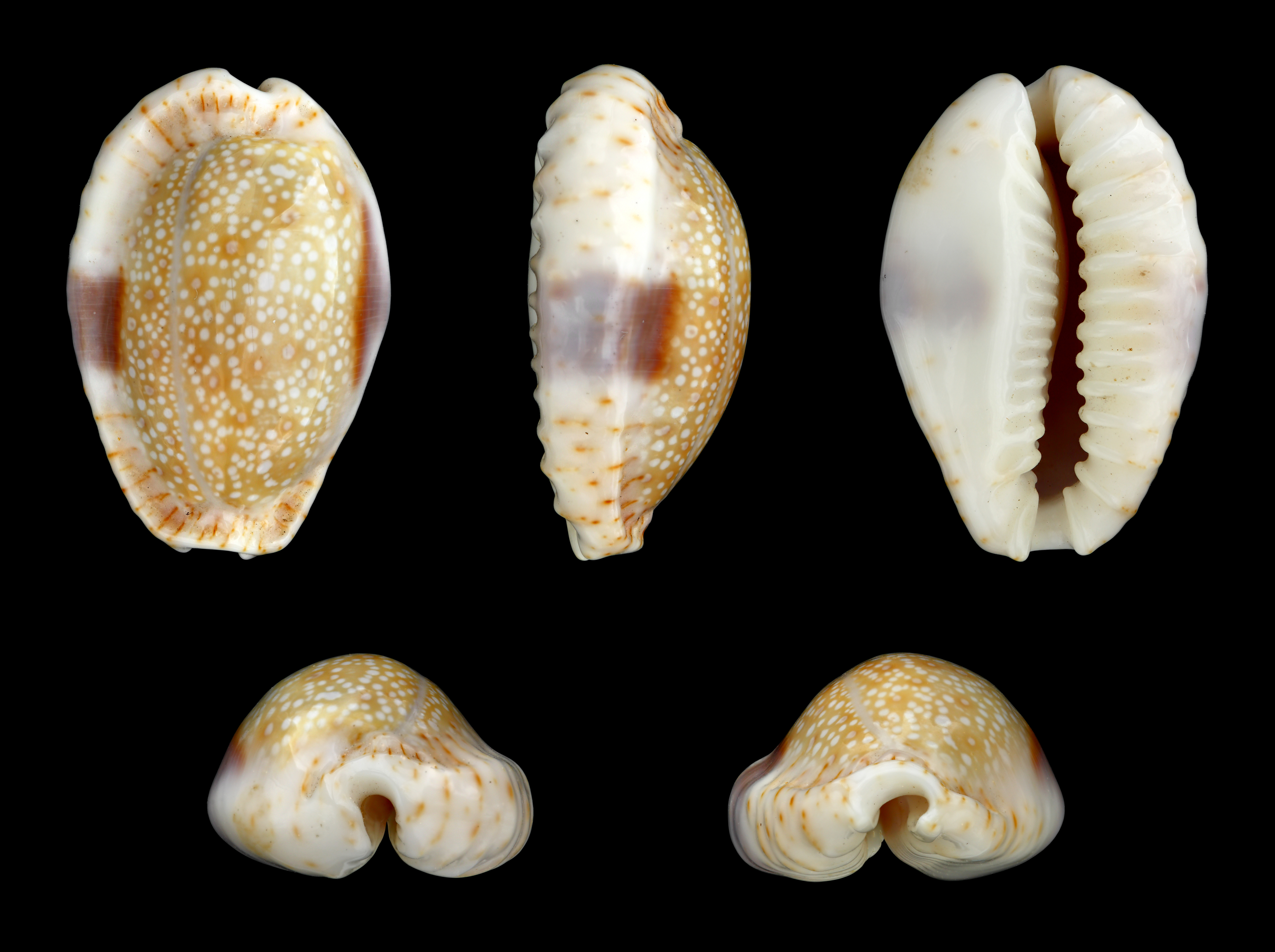
Naria erosa chlorizans

== Distribution ==
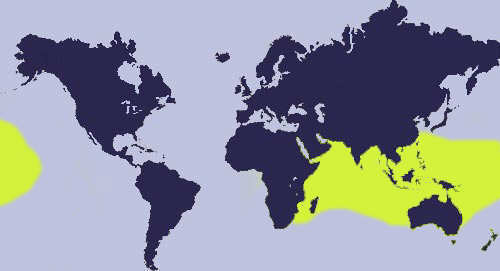
Distribution map of Naria erosa

This species and its subspecies occur in the Indian Ocean along the coasts of Aldabra, Chagos, the Comores, the East Coast of South Africa, Kenya, Madagascar, the Mascarene Basin, Mauritius, Mozambique, Réunion, the Seychelles, Somalia and Tanzania, as well in the Western Pacific Ocean (Malaysia, Australia, Philippines, Polynesia and Hawaii).

== Habitat ==
These cowries live in warm tropical waters, on shallow intertidal reefs or in lagoons at about 2–10 metres (6 ft 7 in – 32 ft 10 in) of depth. Like most other cowries, during the day they usually hide under rocks slabs with the mantle drawn into the shell. They feed only at dawn or dusk.
