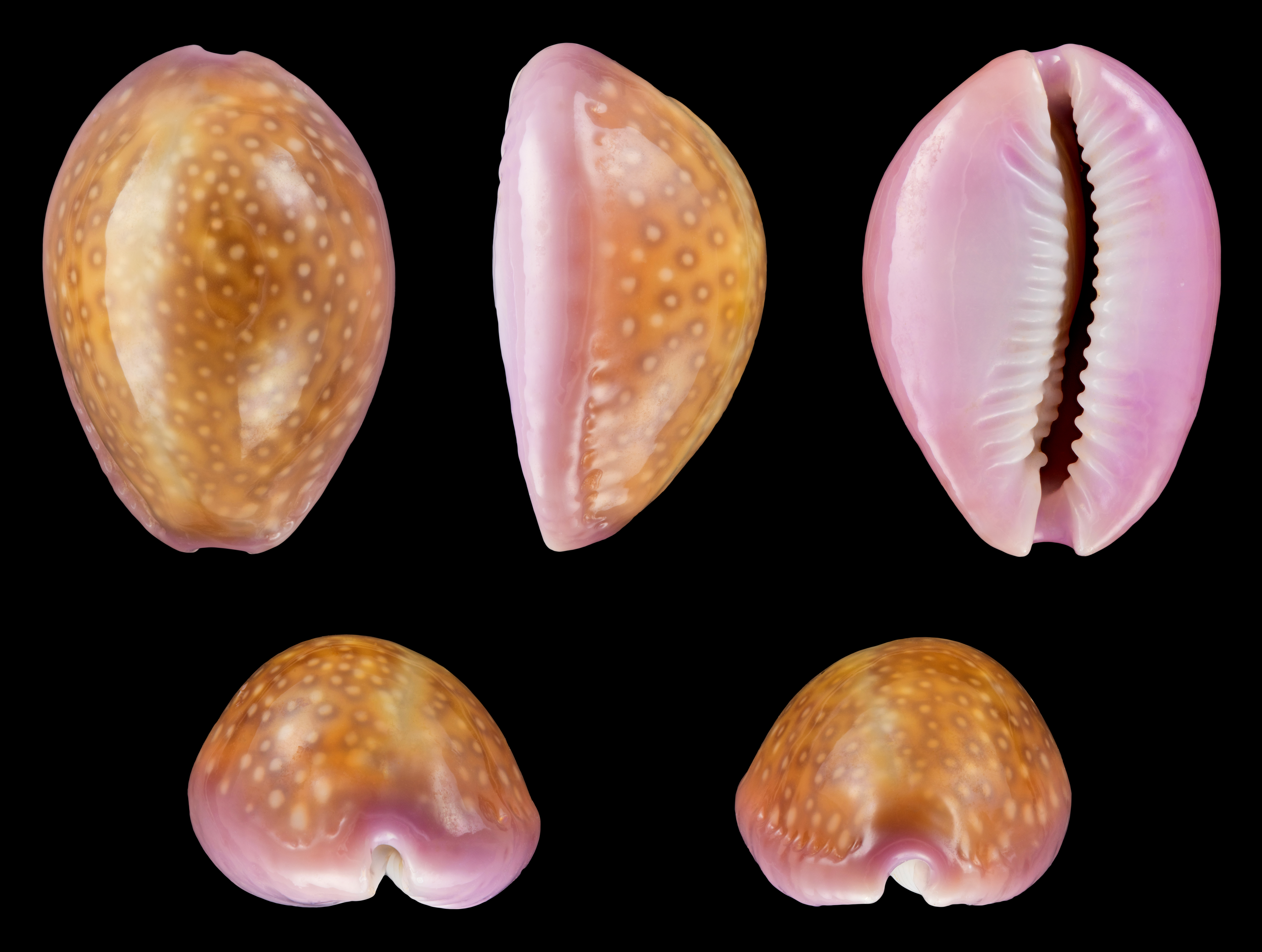
- A shell of Naria poraria

Scientific classification
- Kingdom: Animalia
- Phylum: Mollusca
- Class: Gastropoda
- Subclass: Caenogastropoda
- Order: Littorinimorpha
- Family: Cypraeidae
- Genus: Naria
- Species: N. poraria

Binomial name
- Naria poraria (Linnaeus, 1758)

Synonyms
- Cypraea poraria Linnaeus, 1758 (basionym); Cypraea coeca Röding, P.F., 1798; Cypraea kauaiensis Melvill, J.C., 1888; Cypraea kawaiensis Melvill, J.C., 1888; Cypraea albinella Melvill, J.C. & R. Standen, 1895; Cypraea wilhelmina Kenyon, A., 1897; Cypraea vibex Kenyon, A., 1902; Cypraea insignis Dautzenberg, Ph., 1903; Erosaria poraria (Linnaeus, 1758); Erosaria poraria theoreta (f) Iredale, T., 1939; Erronea mbalavensis Ladd, H.S., 1945

= Naria poraria =

Species of gastropod

Naria poraria, common name the purple-based cowry or porous cowry, is a species of sea snail, a cowry, a marine gastropod mollusk in the family Cypraeidae, the cowries.

== Description ==
The shells of these quite common cowries reach on average 16–19 millimetres (0.63–0.75 in) of length, with a minimum size of 10 millimetres (0.39 in) and a maximum size of 28 millimetres (1.1 in). The surface of the shell is smooth and shiny, the colors usually range from pale brown to dark brown, with numerous small yellowish spots. The base and the margins are purple (hence the common name), while the teeth are commonly white. In the living cowries the mantle is bright red or purplish, with quite long and slightly tree-shaped sensorial papillae. The lateral flaps of the mantle may hide completely the shell surface and may be quickly retracted into the shell opening. Naria poraria is quite similar to Naria albuginosa, but in the second cowry the purple color of the base is paler.

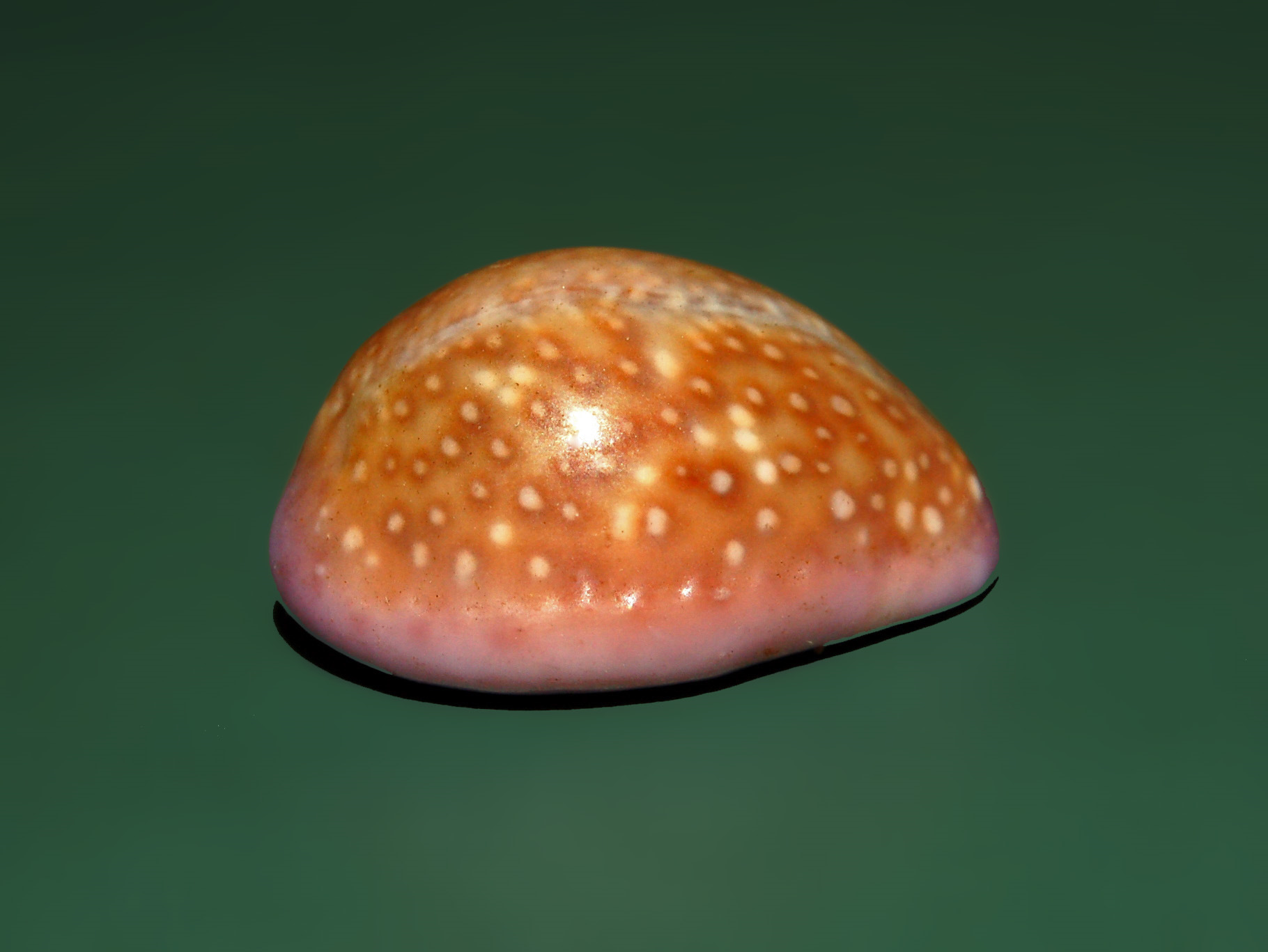
A shell of Naria poraria, lateral view, anterior end towards the right

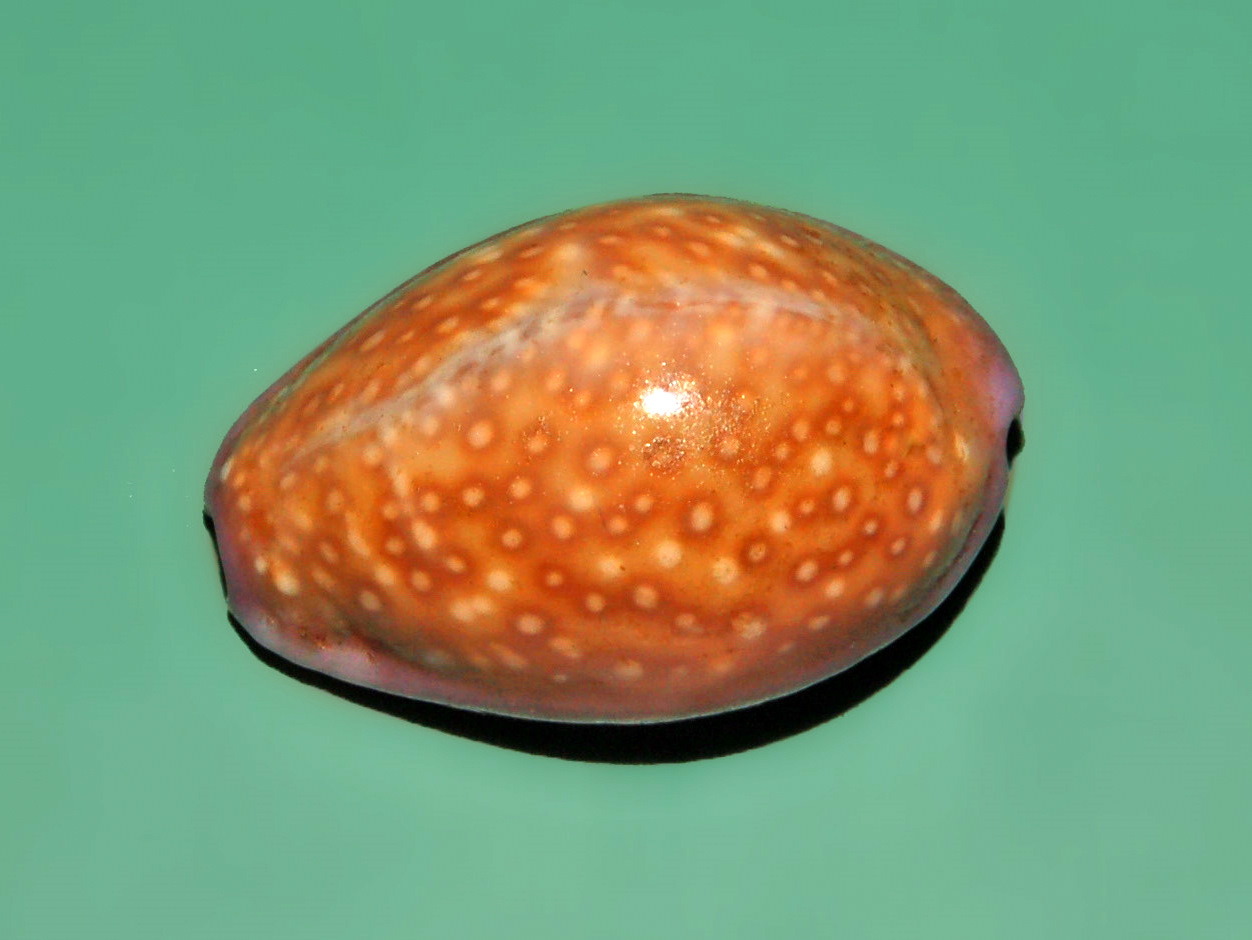
A shell of Naria poraria, dorsal view, anterior end towards the left

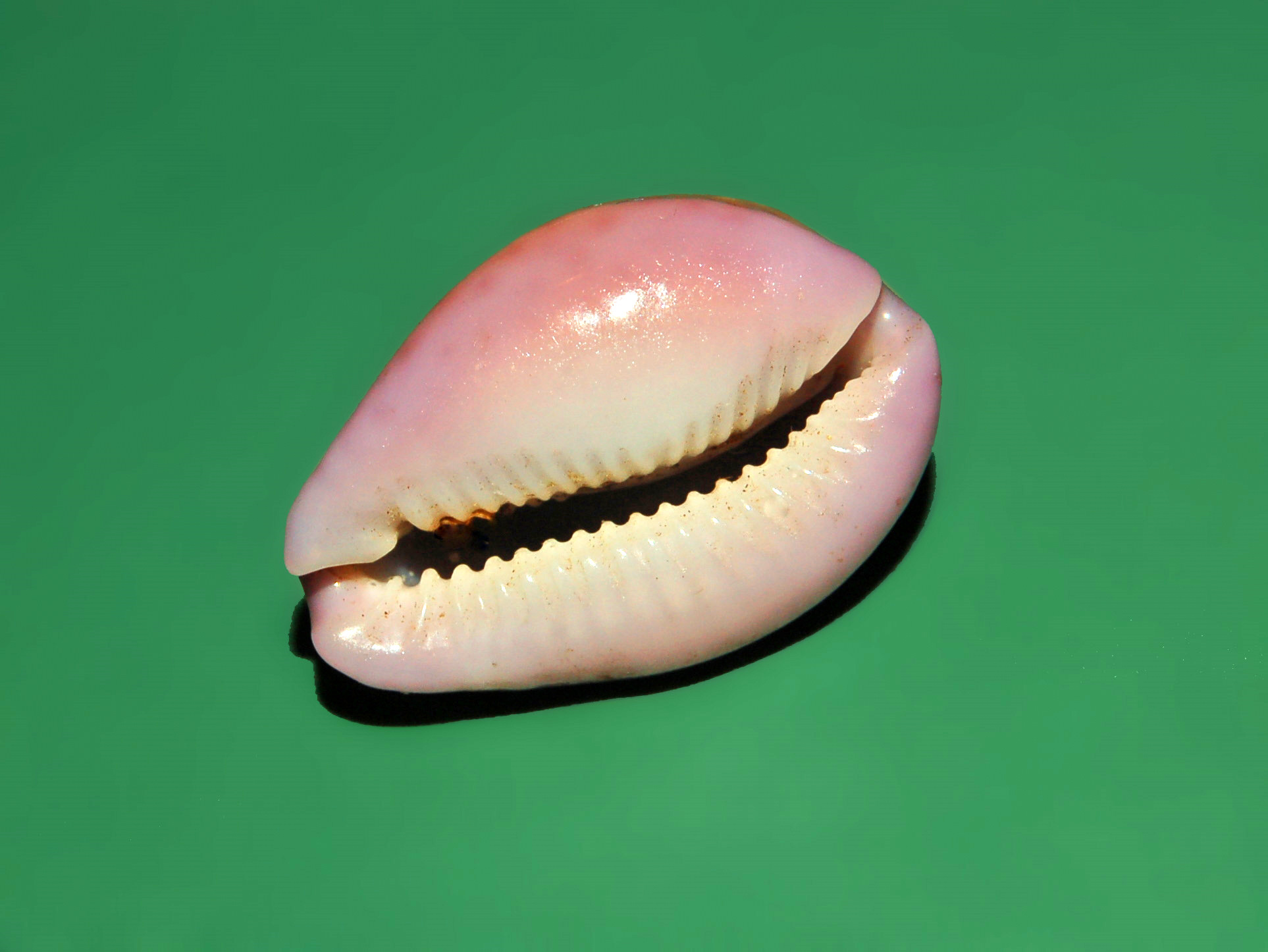
A shell of Naria poraria, dorsal view, anterior end towards the left

== Distribution ==
This species is widely distributed throughout most of the Indo-Pacific, along East Africa (Somalia, Aldabra, Kenya, the Mascarene Basin, Mauritius, Réunion and Tanzania), in the Indian Ocean and in the Pacific Ocean (Chagos, the Seychelles, Sri Lanka, India, Malaysia, Indonesia, New South Wales, New Caledonia, Philippines, Samar Island, Polynesia, Marshall Islands and Hawaii).

== Habitat ==
Naria poraria lives in shallow intertidal water in tropical reef, mainly at 3–10 metres (9.8–32.8 ft) of depth. It is commonly found on dead corals, under large rocks or in caves.
