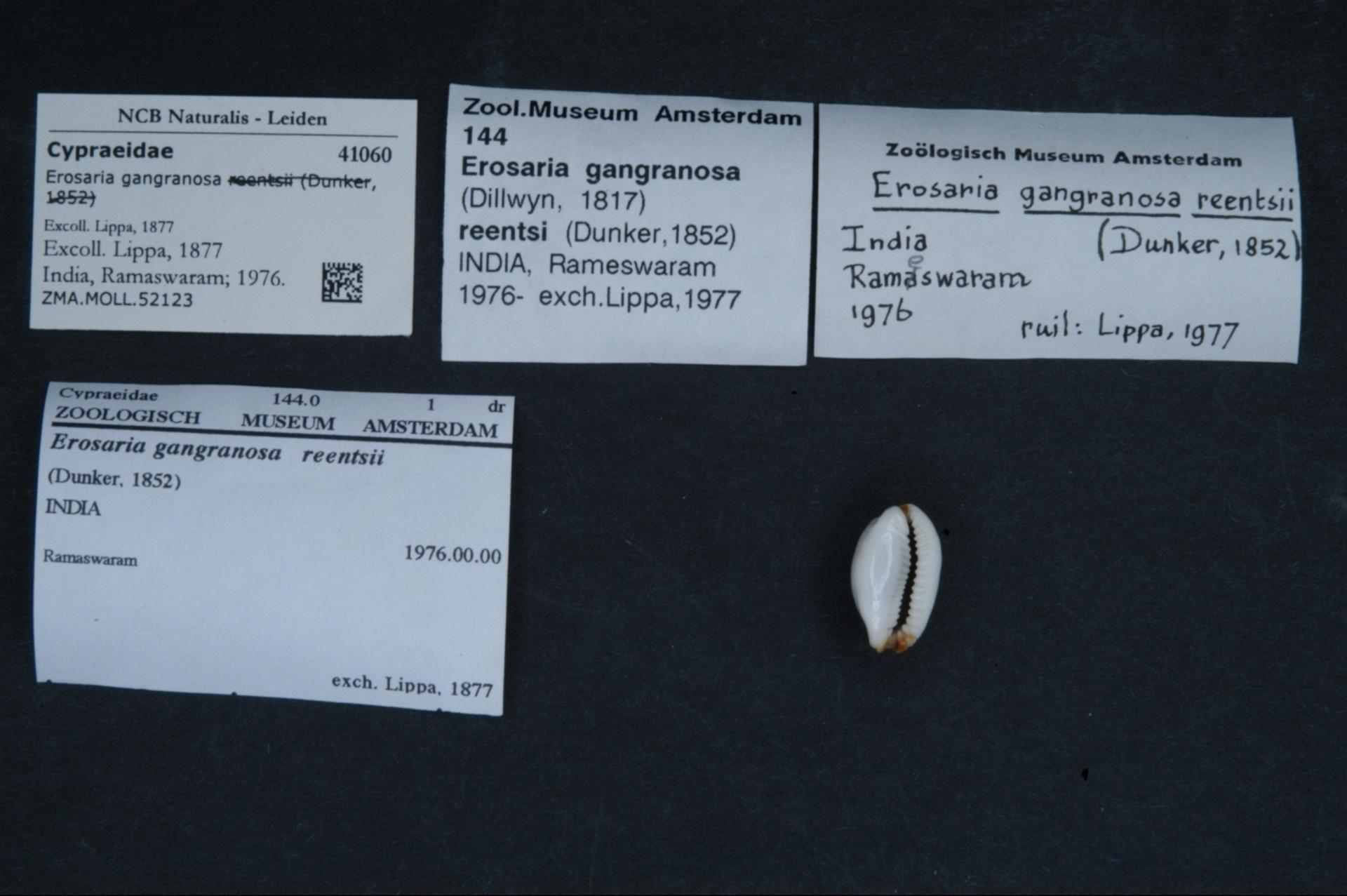
- Naturalis Biodiversity Center - ZMA.MOLL.52123 - Erosaria gangranosa (Dillwyn, 1817) - Cypraeidae - Mollusc shell.

Scientific classification
- Kingdom: Animalia
- Phylum: Mollusca
- Class: Gastropoda
- Subclass: Caenogastropoda
- Order: Littorinimorpha
- Family: Cypraeidae
- Genus: Naria
- Species: N. gangranosa

Binomial name
- Naria gangranosa (Dillwyn, 1817)

Synonyms
- Cypraea gangranosa Dillwyn, 1817 (basionym); Erosaria gangranosa (Dillwyn, 1817)

= Naria gangranosa =

Species of gastropod

Naria gangranosa is a species of sea snail, a cowry, a marine gastropod mollusk in the family Cypraeidae, the cowries.

== Distribution ==
This species occurs in the Red Sea and in the Indian Ocean along Kenya and Tanzania.
