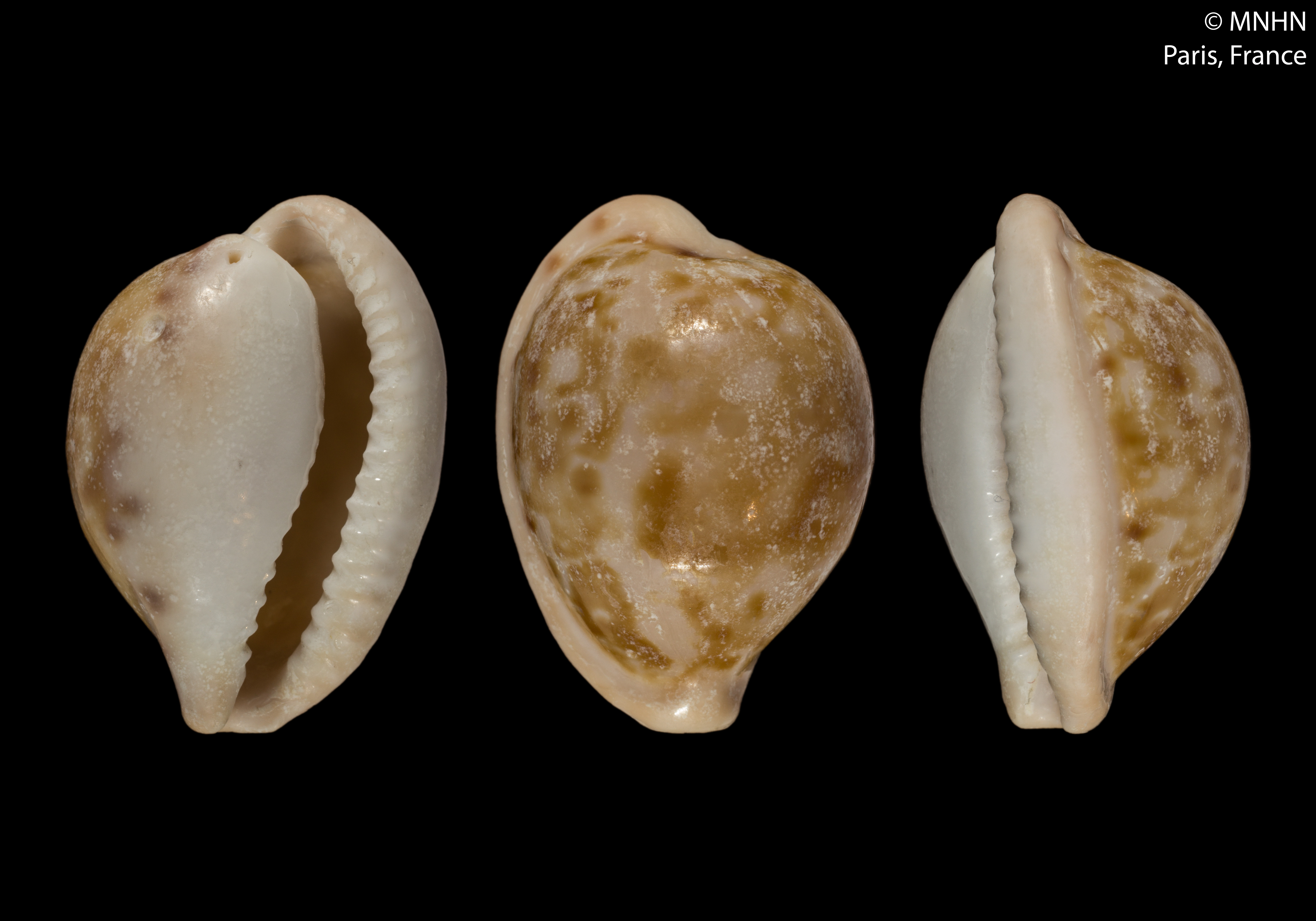
- Shell of Cypraeovula castanea malani (holotype at MNHN, Paris)

Scientific classification
- Kingdom: Animalia
- Phylum: Mollusca
- Class: Gastropoda
- Subclass: Caenogastropoda
- Order: Littorinimorpha
- Family: Cypraeidae
- Genus: Cypraeovula
- Species: C. castanea

Binomial name
- Cypraeovula castanea (Higgins, 1868)

Synonyms
- Cypraea castanea (Higgins, 1868); Cypraea verhoefi Burgess, 1982 (unnecessary substitute name for Luponia castanea, by Burgess treated as a secondary homonym of Cypraea castanea Röding, 1798); Cypraeovula castanea castanea (Higgins, 1868)· accepted, alternate representation; Luponia castanea Higgins, 1868 (basionym)

= Cypraeovula castanea =

Species of gastropod

Cypraeovula castanea is a species of sea snail, a cowry, a marine gastropod mollusc in the family Cypraeidae, the cowries.

== Subspecies ==
- Cypraeovula castanea castanea (Higgins, 1868)
- Cypraeovula castanea latebrosa Swarts & Liltved in Liltved, 2000
- Cypraeovula castanea malani Lorenz & de Bruin, 2009

== Description ==
The length of the shell attains 28.9 mm.

== Distribution ==
This marine species occurs off the Agulhas Bank, South Africa.
