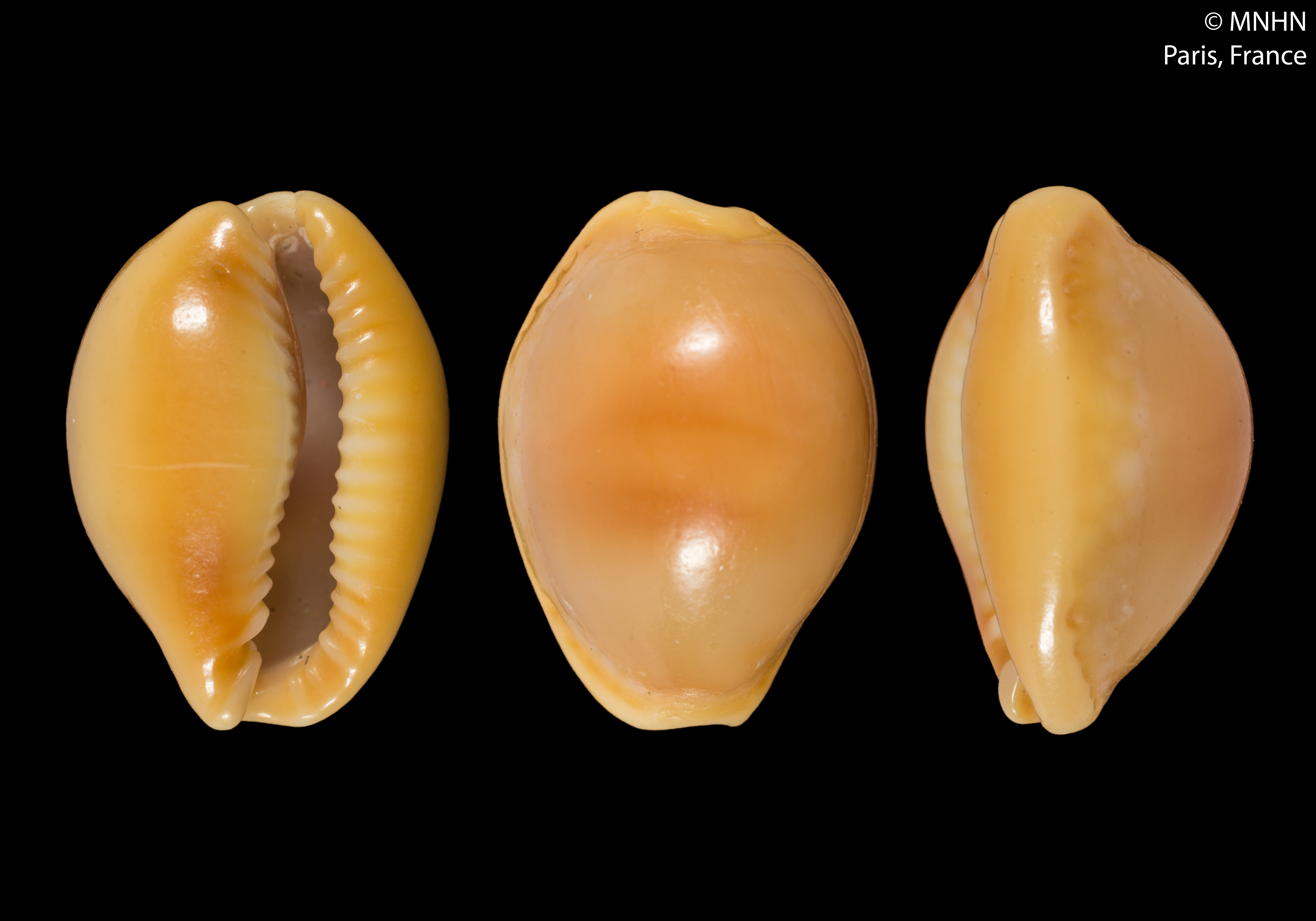
- Shell of Naria citrina dauphinensis (holotype at MNHN, Paris)

Scientific classification
- Kingdom: Animalia
- Phylum: Mollusca
- Class: Gastropoda
- Subclass: Caenogastropoda
- Order: Littorinimorpha
- Family: Cypraeidae
- Genus: Naria
- Species: N. citrina

Binomial name
- Naria citrina (Gray, 1825)

Synonyms
- Cypraea citrina Gray, 1825; Erosaria citrina (Gray, 1825)

= Naria citrina =

Species of gastropod

Naria citrina, common name the orange cowrie, is a species of sea snail, a cowry, a marine gastropod mollusk in the family Cypraeidae, the cowries.

== Subspecies ==
- Naria citrina citrina Gray, 1825
- Naria citrina dauphinensis Lorenz, 2002
- Naria citrina solangeae Bozzetti, 2014: synonym of Naria citrina dauphinensis (Lorenz, 2002)

== Description ==
Fine teeth. Orange-brown with gray spots. Base orange-brown.

== Distribution ==
This species and its subspecies occur in the Indian Ocean off the East Coast of South Africa, Madagascar and Mozambique.
