= Naria macandrewi =

Scientific classification
- Kingdom: Animalia
- Phylum: Mollusca
- Class: Gastropoda
- Subclass: Caenogastropoda
- Order: Littorinimorpha
- Family: Cypraeidae
- Genus: Naria
- Species: N. macandrewi

Binomial name
- Naria macandrewi (Sowerby III, 1870)

Synonyms
- Cypraea macandrewi Sowerby III, 1870 (basionym); Erosaria macandrewi (Sowerby III, 1870)

Species of gastropod

Naria macandrewi, common name : MacAndrew's cowry, is a species of sea snail, a cowry, a marine gastropod mollusk in the family Cypraeidae, the cowries.

== Description ==
The shell size varies between 9 mm and 27 mm.

== Distribution ==
This species occurs in the Red Sea, Oman, Djibouti, and along Eritrea.
