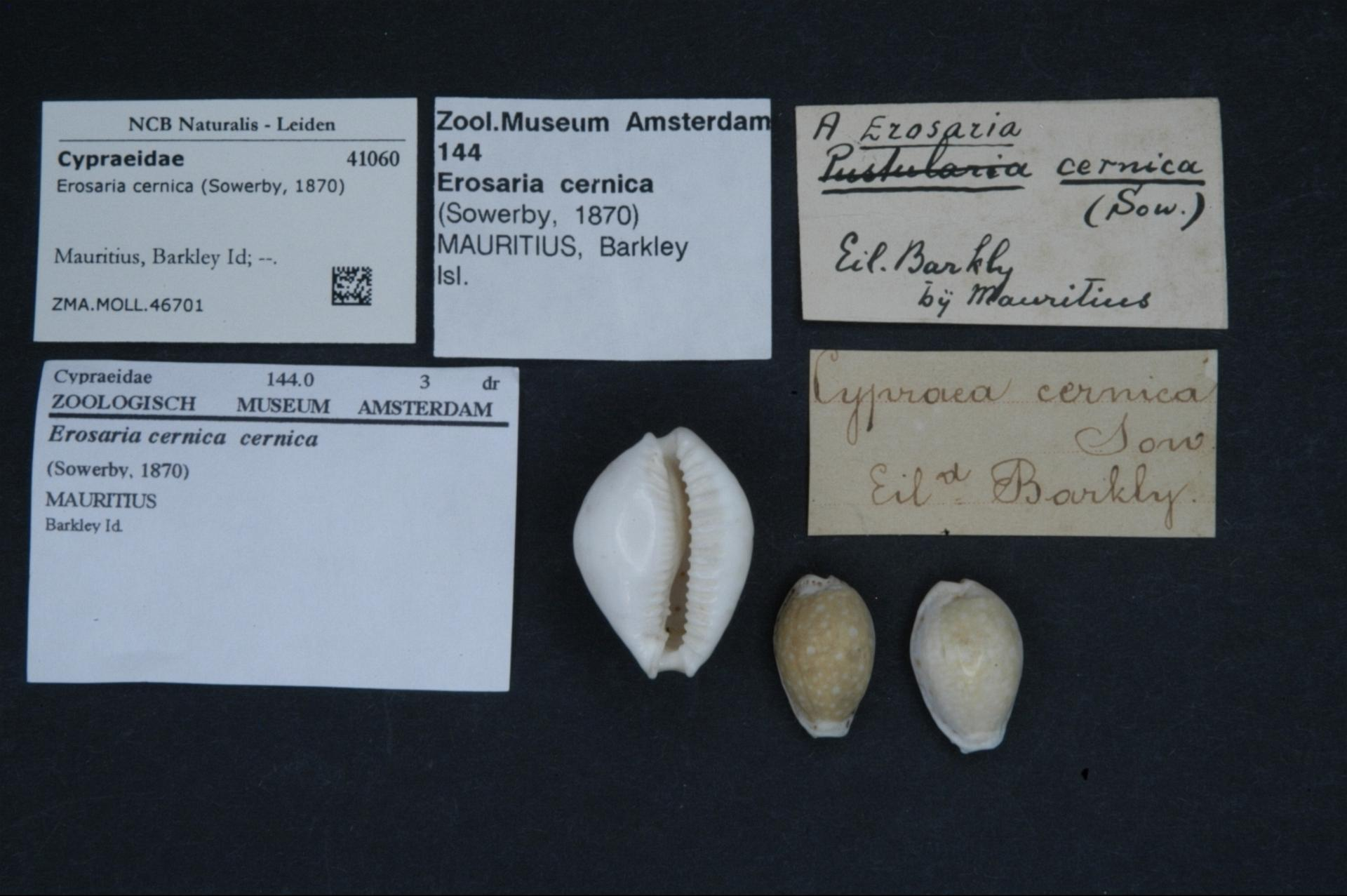

Scientific classification
- Kingdom: Animalia
- Phylum: Mollusca
- Class: Gastropoda
- Subclass: Caenogastropoda
- Order: Littorinimorpha
- Family: Cypraeidae
- Genus: Naria
- Species: N. cernica

Binomial name
- Naria cernica (G.B. Sowerby II, 1870)

Synonyms
- Cypraea (Erosaria) cernica (G. B. Sowerby II, 1870); Cypraea cernica G.B. Sowerby II, 1870; Erosaria cernica (G.B. Sowerby II, 1870); Erosaria (Ravitrona) cernica (G. B. Sowerby II, 1870)

= Naria cernica =

Species of gastropod

Naria cernica is a species of sea snail, a cowry, a marine gastropod mollusk in the family Cypraeidae, the cowries.

Subspecies

- Naria cernica cernica (G. B. Sowerby II, 1870)
- Naria cernica leforti (Senders & P. Martin, 1987)
- Naria cernica viridicolor (C. N. Cate, 1962)
- Naria cernica marielae (Cate, 1960): synonym of Naria cernica cernica (G. B. Sowerby II, 1870)
- Naria cernica ogasawarensis (Schilder, 1944): synonym of Naria cernica cernica (G. B. Sowerby II, 1870)
- Naria cernica tomlini (Schilder, 1930): synonym of Naria cernica cernica (G. B. Sowerby II, 1870)

== Distribution ==
This species occurs in the Indian Ocean off Chagos, Easter Island, the Mascarene Basin and Mauritius, Western Australia.
