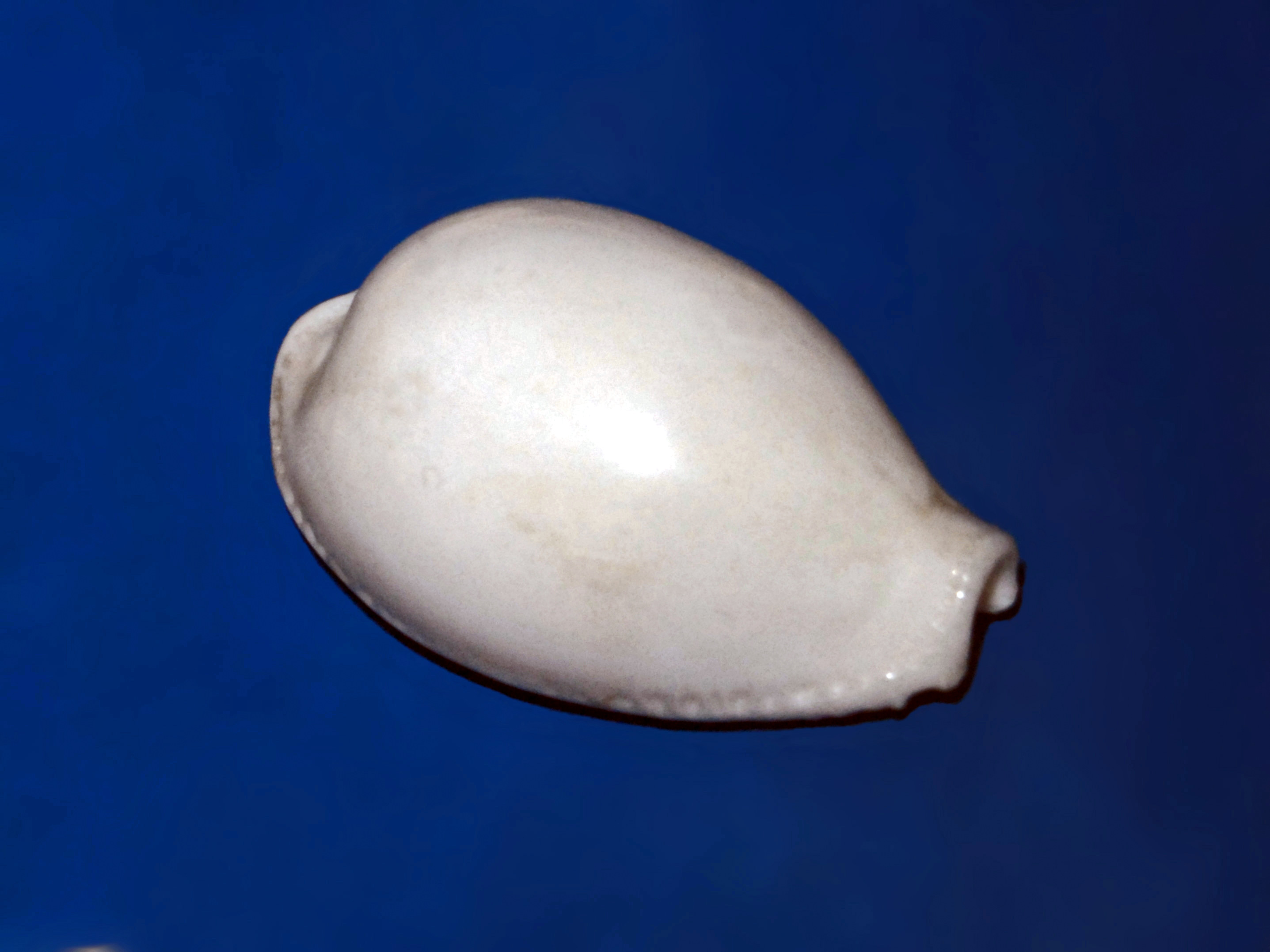

Scientific classification
- Kingdom: Animalia
- Phylum: Mollusca
- Class: Gastropoda
- Subclass: Caenogastropoda
- Order: Littorinimorpha
- Family: Cypraeidae
- Genus: Naria
- Species: N. eburnea

Binomial name
- Naria eburnea (Barnes, 1824)

Synonyms
- Cypraea eburnea Barnes, 1824 (basionym); Erosaria eburnea (Barnes, 1824)

= Naria eburnea =

Species of gastropod

Naria eburnea, common name ivory cowry, is a species of sea snail, a cowry, a marine gastropod mollusk in the family Cypraeidae, the cowries.

== Description ==
Naria eburnea has a shell reaching a size of about 35–45 mm [1.38–1.77 inches]. The coloration of this shell is light white. In the living cowries, the mantle is brown or greyish, with paler finger-like projections.

== Distribution ==
This species can be found in the South Pacific Ocean, as far north as Palau, and as far east as Fiji.
