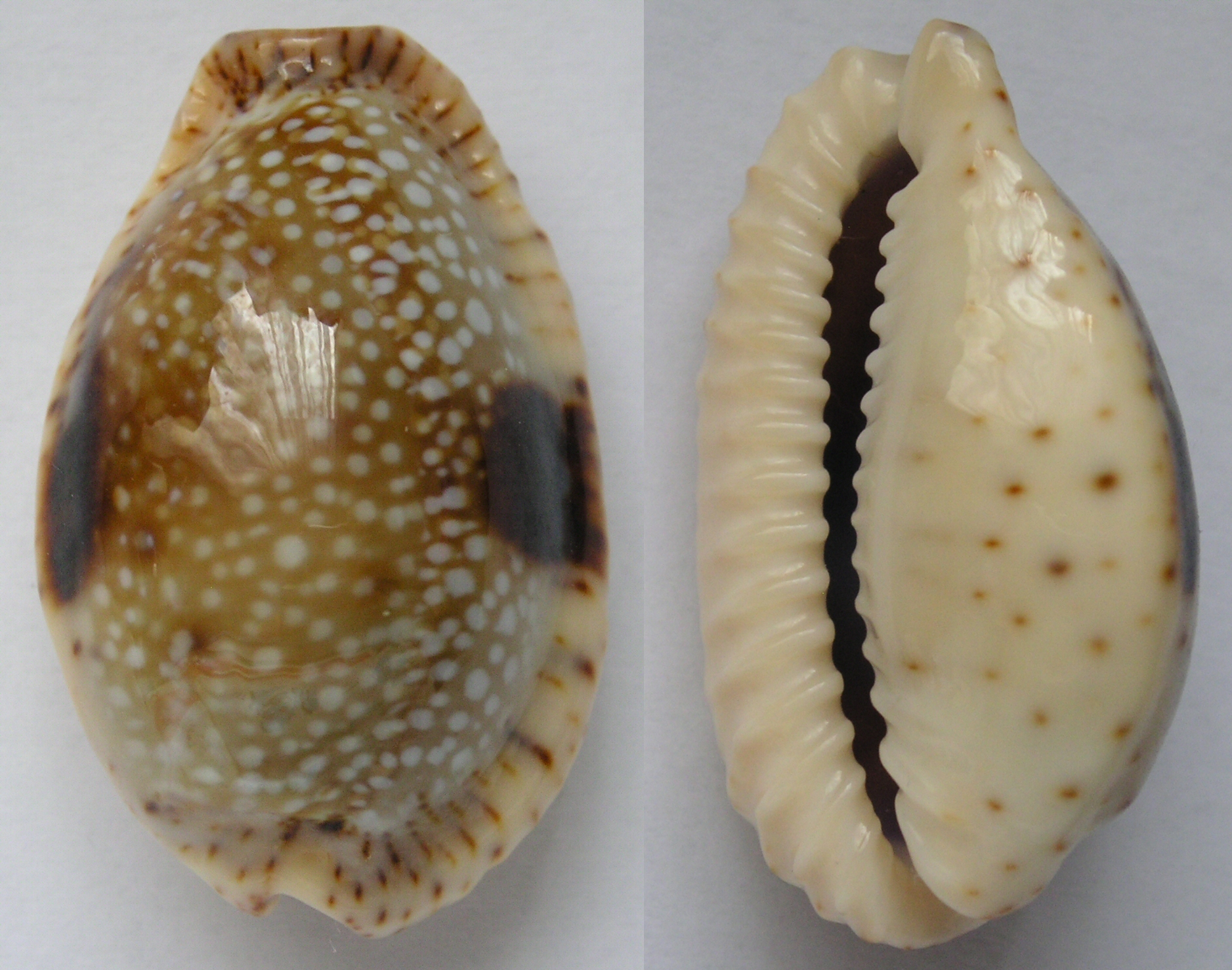
- Two views of a shell of Naria nebrites, anterior end towards the top

Scientific classification
- Kingdom: Animalia
- Phylum: Mollusca
- Class: Gastropoda
- Subclass: Caenogastropoda
- Order: Littorinimorpha
- Family: Cypraeidae
- Genus: Naria
- Species: N. nebrites

Binomial name
- Naria nebrites (Melvill, 1888)

Synonyms
- Cypraea stellata Perry, 1811; Cypraea erosa nebrites Melvill, 1888; Cypraea nebrites Melvill, 1888; Cypraea carmen Smith, 1912; Cypraea erosa carmen Smith, 1912; Erosaria mozambicana F.A.Schilder & M.Schilder, 1938; Erosaria nebrites (Melvill, 1888); Erosaria ocellata fasciomaculata G.S.Coen, 1949

= Naria nebrites =

Species of gastropod

Naria nebrites, common name the false margined cowry, is a species of sea snail, a cowry, a marine gastropod mollusk in the family Cypraeidae, the cowries.

== Subspecies and formae ==
- Naria nebrites ceylonica (f) Schilder, F.A. & M. Schilder, 1938
- Naria nebrites oblonga (f) Melvill, J.C., 1888

== Distribution ==
This species is distributed in the Red Sea and in the Indian Ocean along East Africa, Eritrea, Kenya, Somalia, Sri Lanka and Singapore.
