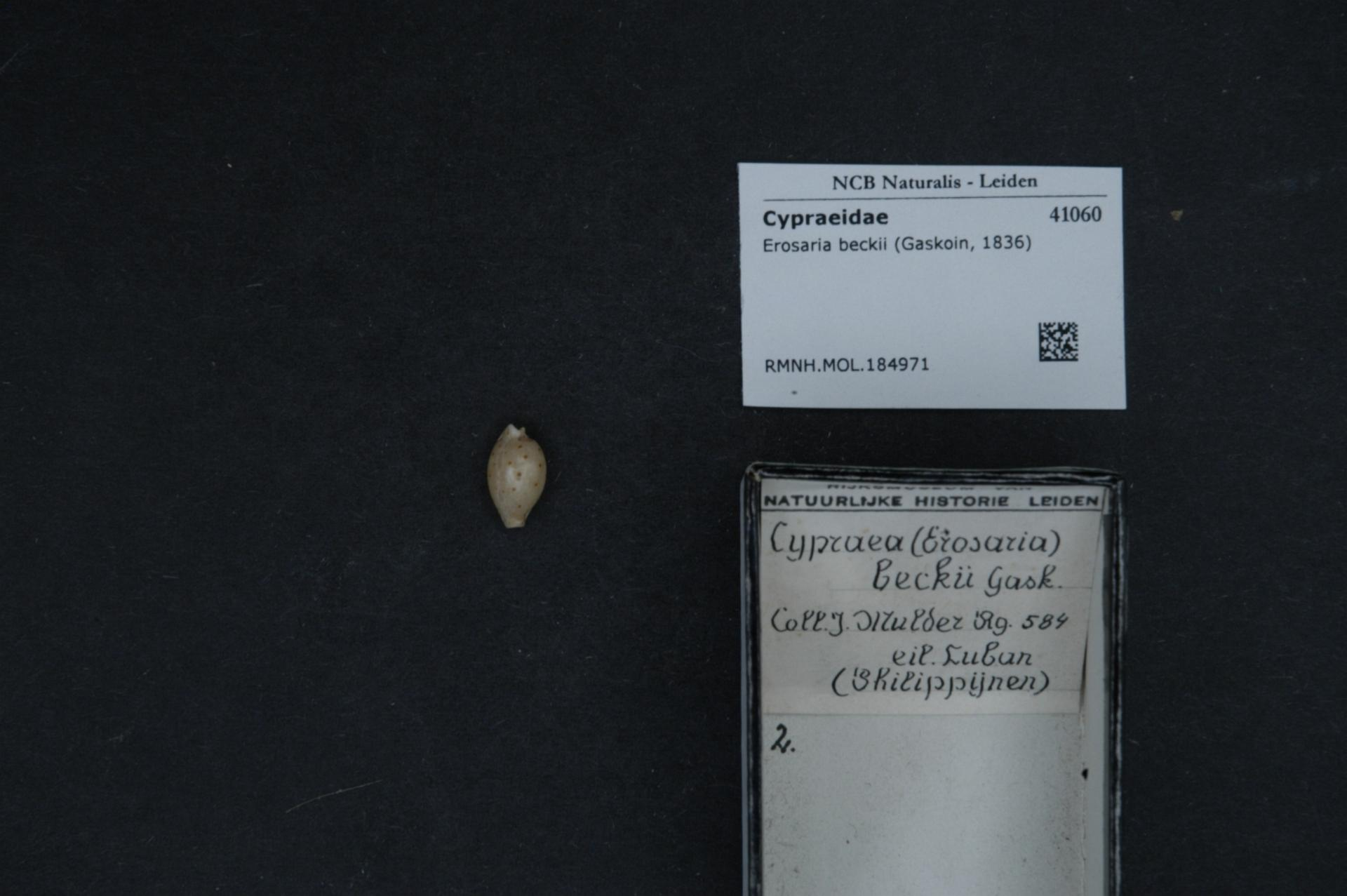
- Naturalis Biodiversity Center – RMNH.MOL.184971 – Erosaria beckii (Gaskoin, 1836) – Cypraeidae – Mollusc shell.

Scientific classification
- Kingdom: Animalia
- Phylum: Mollusca
- Class: Gastropoda
- Subclass: Caenogastropoda
- Order: Littorinimorpha
- Family: Cypraeidae
- Genus: Naria
- Species: N. beckii

Binomial name
- Naria beckii (Gaskoin, 1836)

Synonyms
- Cypraea (Erosaria) beckii Gaskoin, 1836; Cypraea beckii Gaskoin, 1836 (basionym); Erosaria beckii (Gaskoin, 1836)

= Naria beckii =

Species of gastropod

Naria beckii is a species of sea snail, a cowry, a marine gastropod mollusk in the family Cypraeidae, the cowries.
