= Naria marginalis =

Scientific classification
- Kingdom: Animalia
- Phylum: Mollusca
- Class: Gastropoda
- Subclass: Caenogastropoda
- Order: Littorinimorpha
- Family: Cypraeidae
- Genus: Naria
- Species: N. marginalis

Binomial name
- Naria marginalis (Dillwyn, 1817)

Synonyms
- Cypraea marginalis Dillwyn, 1817 (basionym); Erosaria marginalis (Dillwyn, 1817)

Species of gastropod

Naria marginalis is a species of sea snail, a cowry, a marine gastropod mollusk in the family Cypraeidae, the cowries.

== Distribution ==
This species is distributed in the Indian Ocean along Kenya, Mozambique, Somalia, South Africa and Tanzania.
