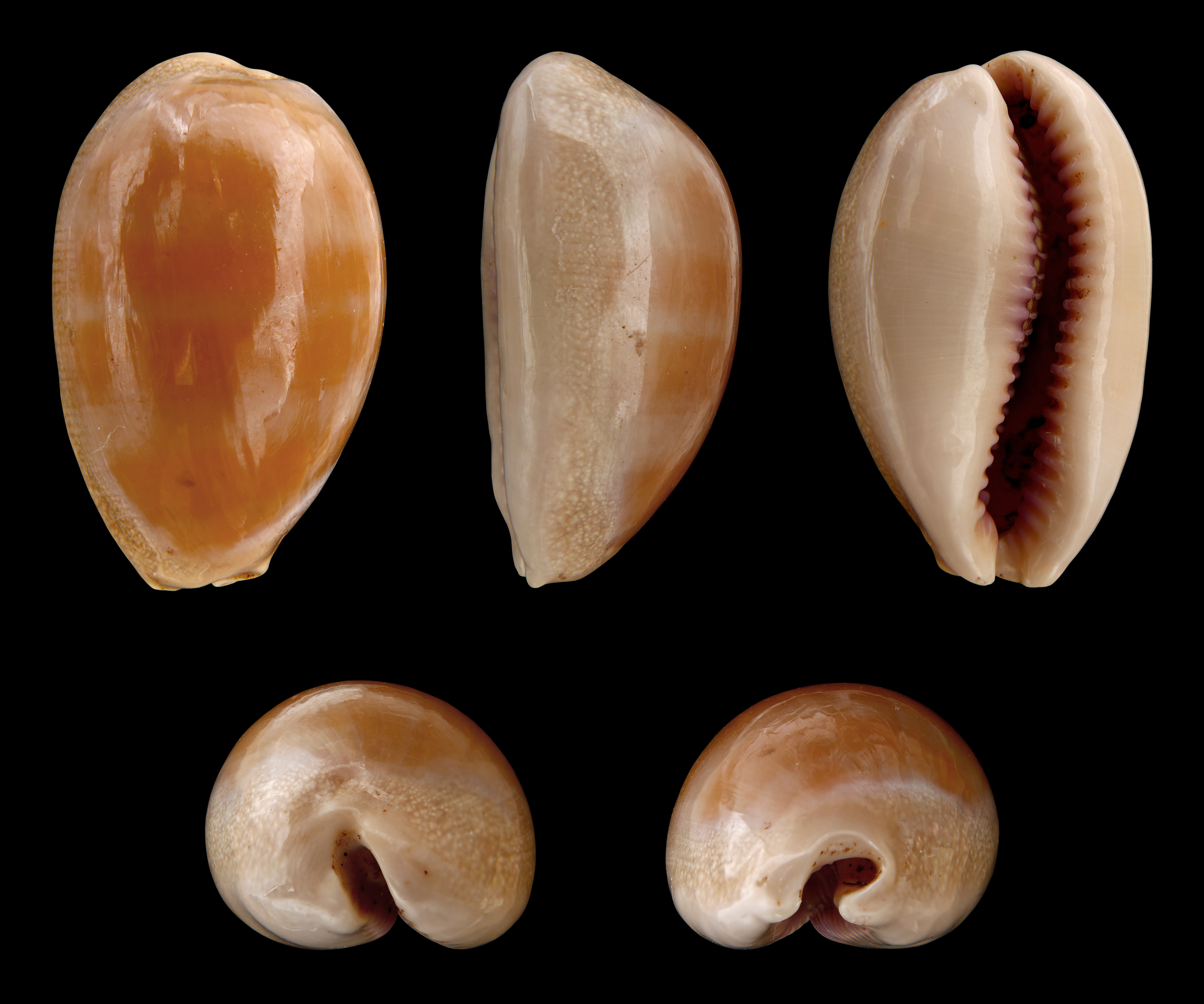
- Five views of a shell of Lyncina carneola

Scientific classification
- Kingdom: Animalia
- Phylum: Mollusca
- Class: Gastropoda
- Subclass: Caenogastropoda
- Order: Littorinimorpha
- Superfamily: Cypraeoidea
- Family: Cypraeidae
- Genus: Lyncina; Troschel, 1861

Type species
- Cypraea lynx Linnaeus, 1758

Synonyms
- Cypraea (Lyncina) Troschel, 1863 (original rank); Callistocypraea Schilder, 1927; Mystaponda Iredale, 1930; Ponda Jousseaume, 1884

= Lyncina =

Genus of gastropods

Lyncina is a genus of sea snails, marine gastropod molluscs in the family Cypraeidae, the cowries.

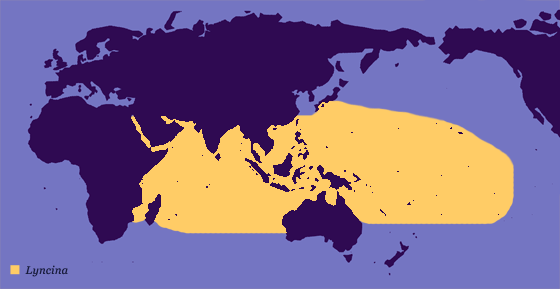
Distribution map of the genus Lyncina

== Species ==
Species within the genus Lyncina include:

- Lyncina aliceae Lum, 2013
- † Lyncina amygdalina (Grateloup, 1846)
- † Lyncina aquitanica Schilder, 1927
- Lyncina camelopardalis (Perry, 1811)
- Lyncina carneola (Linnaeus, 1758)
- † Lyncina cingulata Dolin & Lozouet, 2004
- † Lyncina eristicos Dolin & Lozouet, 2004
- † Lyncina gourguesi Dolin, 1998
- † Lyncina imperialis Dolin & Lozouet, 2004
- Lyncina kuroharai (Kuroda & Habe, 1961)
- Lyncina leucodon (Broderip, 1832)
- Lyncina leviathan Schilder & Schilder, 1937
- Lyncina lynx (Linnaeus, 1758)
- † Lyncina maestratii Dolin & Lozouet, 2004
- † Lyncina magnifica Dolin & Lozouet, 2004
- † Lyncina miopropinqua Dolin & Lozouet, 2004
- † Lyncina peyroti (Schilder, 1932)
- † Lyncina ponderosa Dolin & Lozouet, 2004
- † Lyncina praemiocaenica (Venzo, 1937)
- † Lyncina prevostina (Grateloup, 1847)
- Lyncina propinqua (Garrett, 1879)
- Lyncina schilderorum Iredale, 1939
- Lyncina sulcidentata Gray, 1824
- † Lyncina testicula Dolin & Lozouet, 2004
- † Lyncina titaniana Dolin & Lozouet, 2004
- † Lyncina tumida (Grateloup, 1834)
- Lyncina ventriculus (Lamarck, 1810)
- Lyncina vitellus (Linnaeus, 1758)

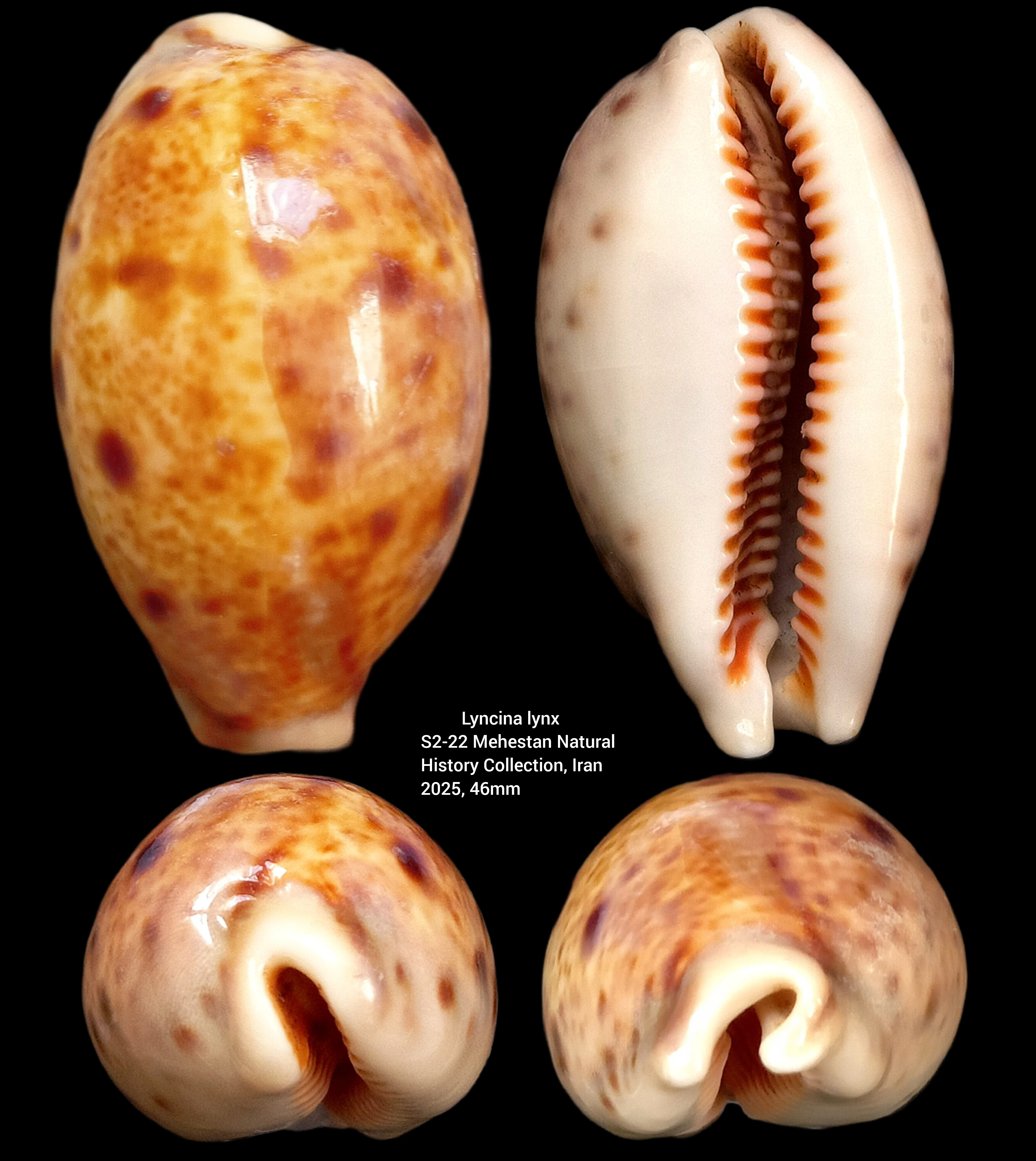
Lyncina lynx S2-22 46mm

Species brought into synonymy

- Lyncina argus (Linnaeus, 1758): synonym of Arestorides argus (Linnaeus, 1758)
- Lyncina aurantium (Gmelin, 1791): synonym of Callistocypraea aurantium (Gmelin, 1791)
- Lyncina broderipii Gray in Sowerby, 1832: synonym of Callistocypraea broderipii (J. E. Gray in G. B. Sowerby I, 1832)
- Lyncina joycae (Clover, 1970): synonym of Raybaudia joycae (Clover, 1970)
- Lyncina leucodon (Broderip, 1828): synonym of Callistocypraea leucodon (Broderip, 1828)
- Lyncina nivosa (Broderip, 1827): synonym of Callistocypraea nivosa (Broderip, 1827)
- Lyncina porteri (Cate, 1966): synonym of Raybaudia porteri (C. N. Cate, 1966)
