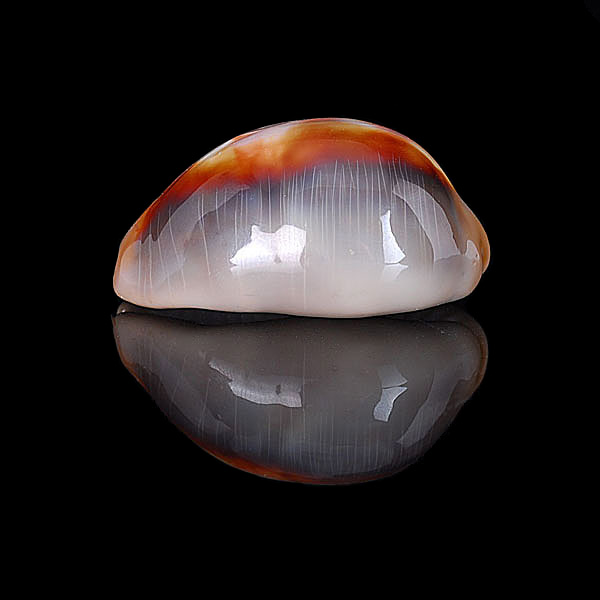
- A shell of Lyncina ventriculus, lateral view, anterior end towards the left

Scientific classification
- Kingdom: Animalia
- Phylum: Mollusca
- Class: Gastropoda
- Subclass: Caenogastropoda
- Order: Littorinimorpha
- Family: Cypraeidae
- Genus: Lyncina
- Species: L. ventriculus

Binomial name
- Lyncina ventriculus Lamarck, 1810

Synonyms
- Cypraea ventriculus Lamarck, 1810; Cypraea achatina (Perry, 1811); Cypraea otahitensis (Schubert & Wagner 1829); Cypraea topee (Steadman & Cotton 1943); Ponda ventriculus (Lamarck, 1810)

= Lyncina ventriculus =

Species of gastropod

Lyncina ventriculus, the ventral cowry, is a species of sea snail, a cowry, a marine gastropod mollusk in the family Cypraeidae, the cowries.

== Description ==
The shells of these uncommon cowries reach on average 45–50 millimetres (1.8–2.0 in) of length, with a minimum size of 32 millimetres (1.3 in) and a maximum size of 75 millimetres (3.0 in). The shape of these smooth and shiny shells is usually oval, the dorsum surface is generally reddish brown, with four dark brown transversal bands, while the sides are definitely chocolate brown and present several vertical thin lines. The base may be white, pale pink or pale brown, the aperture is long and narrow, with short teeth on both lips. The shell is quite similar to Lyncina schilderorum, Lyncina carneola and Lyncina sulcidentata. In the living cowries the mantle is dark-grey, with clearer sensorial papillae.

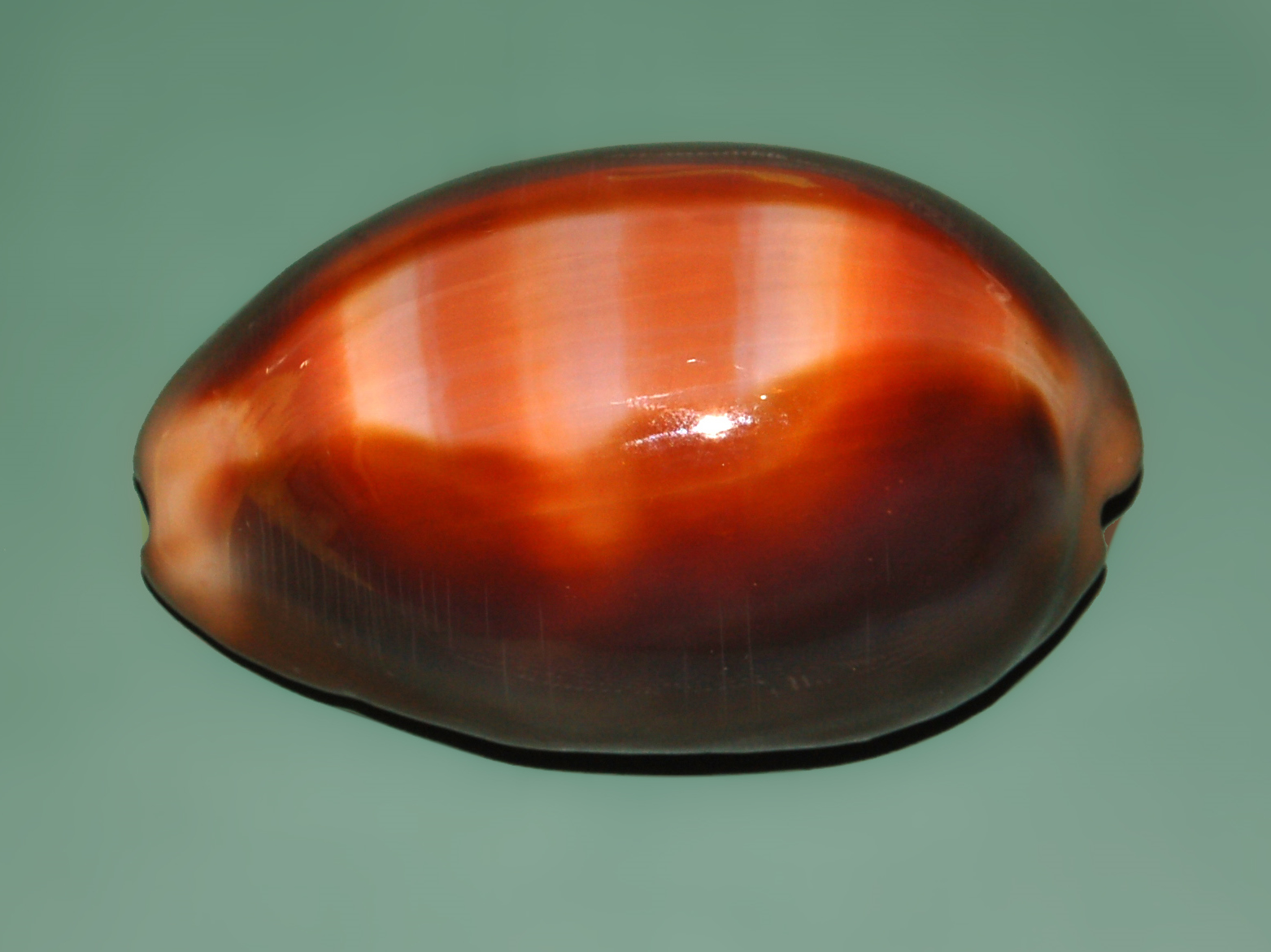
A shell of Lyncina ventriculus from Philippines, dorsal view, anterior end towards the right

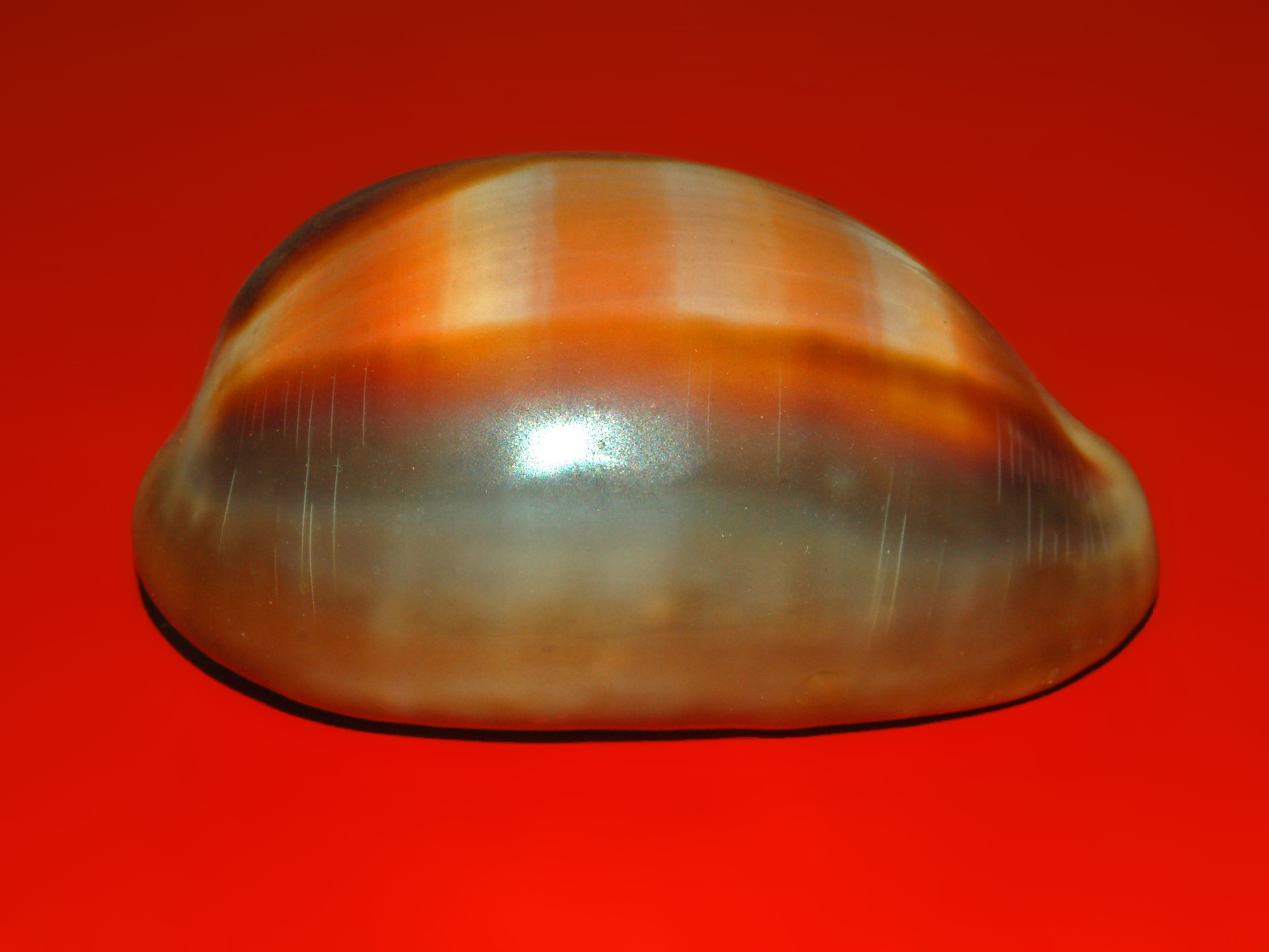
A shell of Lyncina ventriculus from Philippines, lateral view, anterior end towards the left

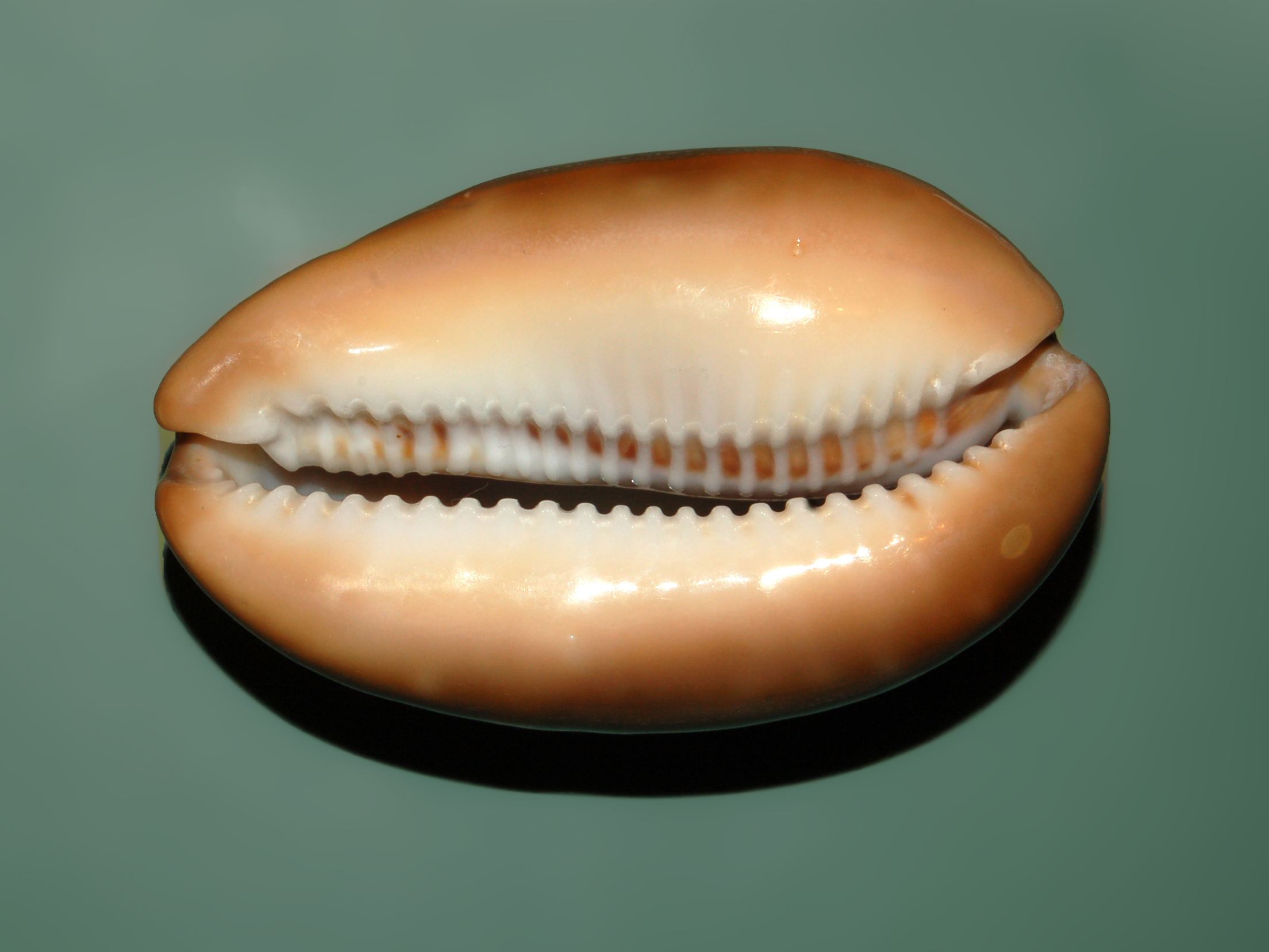
A shell of Lyncina ventriculus from Philippines, ventral view, anterior end towards the left

== Distribution ==
This species is distributed in the eastern Indian Ocean (Malaysia, Eastern Indonesia, Cocos Islands and Christmas Island), in the Central and Western Pacific Ocean (South China Sea, Taiwan, Philippines, Samar Island, Guam, Melanesia, Solomon Islands, Micronesia, New Caledonia, eastern Polynesia, Tahiti and Hawaii).

== Habitat ==
They live in tropical intertidal and subtidal water and in continental shelf up to about 30 metres (98 ft) of depth, usually on coral reef.
