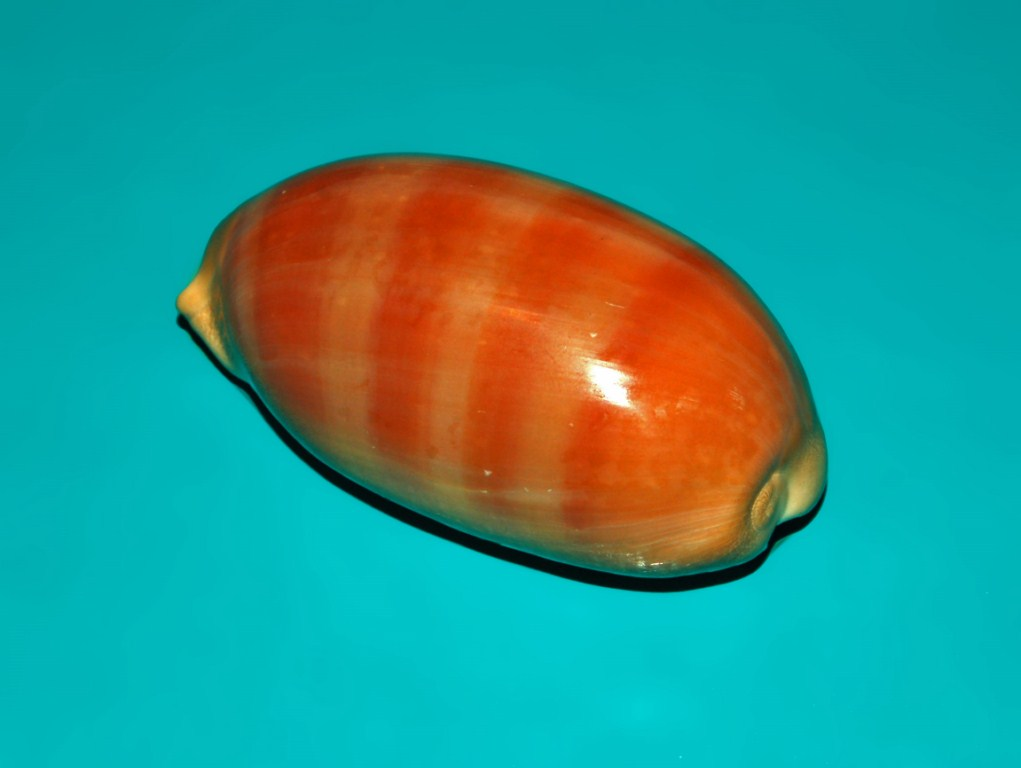
- A shell of Lyncina leviathan leviathan from Hawaii, anterior end towards the left

Scientific classification
- Kingdom: Animalia
- Phylum: Mollusca
- Class: Gastropoda
- Subclass: Caenogastropoda
- Order: Littorinimorpha
- Family: Cypraeidae
- Genus: Lyncina
- Species: L. leviathan

Binomial name
- Lyncina leviathan Schilder & Schilder, 1937

Synonyms
- Cypraea leviathan (Schilder & Schilder, 1937)

= Lyncina leviathan =

Species of gastropod

Lyncina leviathan is a species of tropical sea snail, a cowry, a marine gastropod mollusk in the family Cypraeidae, the cowries.

== Description ==
The shells of these cowries reach on average 60 millimetres (2.4 in) of length, with a minimum size of 22 millimetres (0.87 in) and a maximum size of 98 millimetres (3.9 in). The dorsum surface of these elongated, smooth and shiny shells is pink-salmon, crossed by darker bands. The base is whitish or pale pinkish or pale brown, with a long and wide aperture with several teeth. In the living cowries the mantle is brownish, almost transparent and well developed, with external antennae and several sensorial tree-shaped papillae. This species is superficially similar to Lyncina carneola.

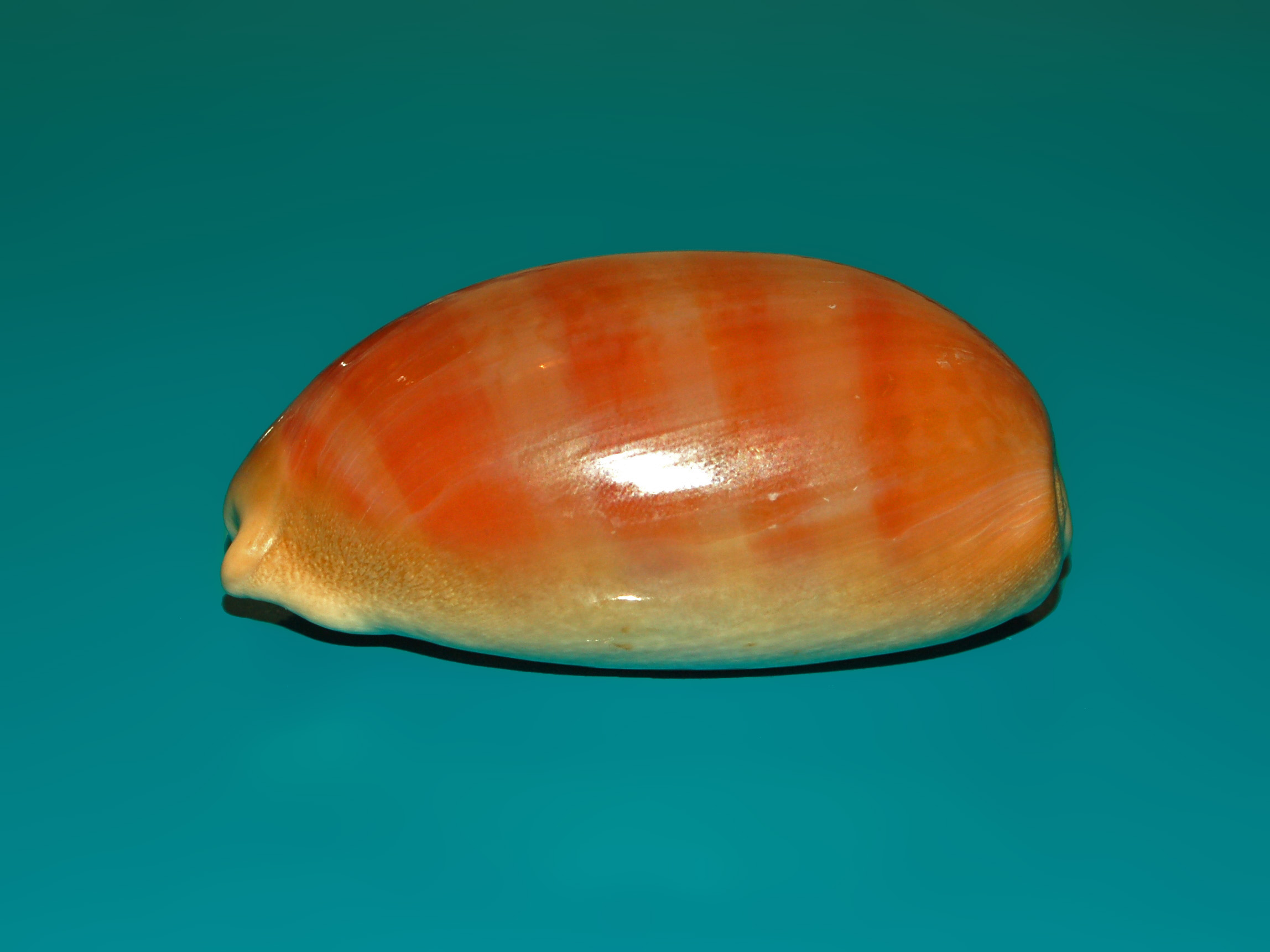
A shell of Lyncina leviathan leviathan from Hawaii, lateral view, anterior end towards the left

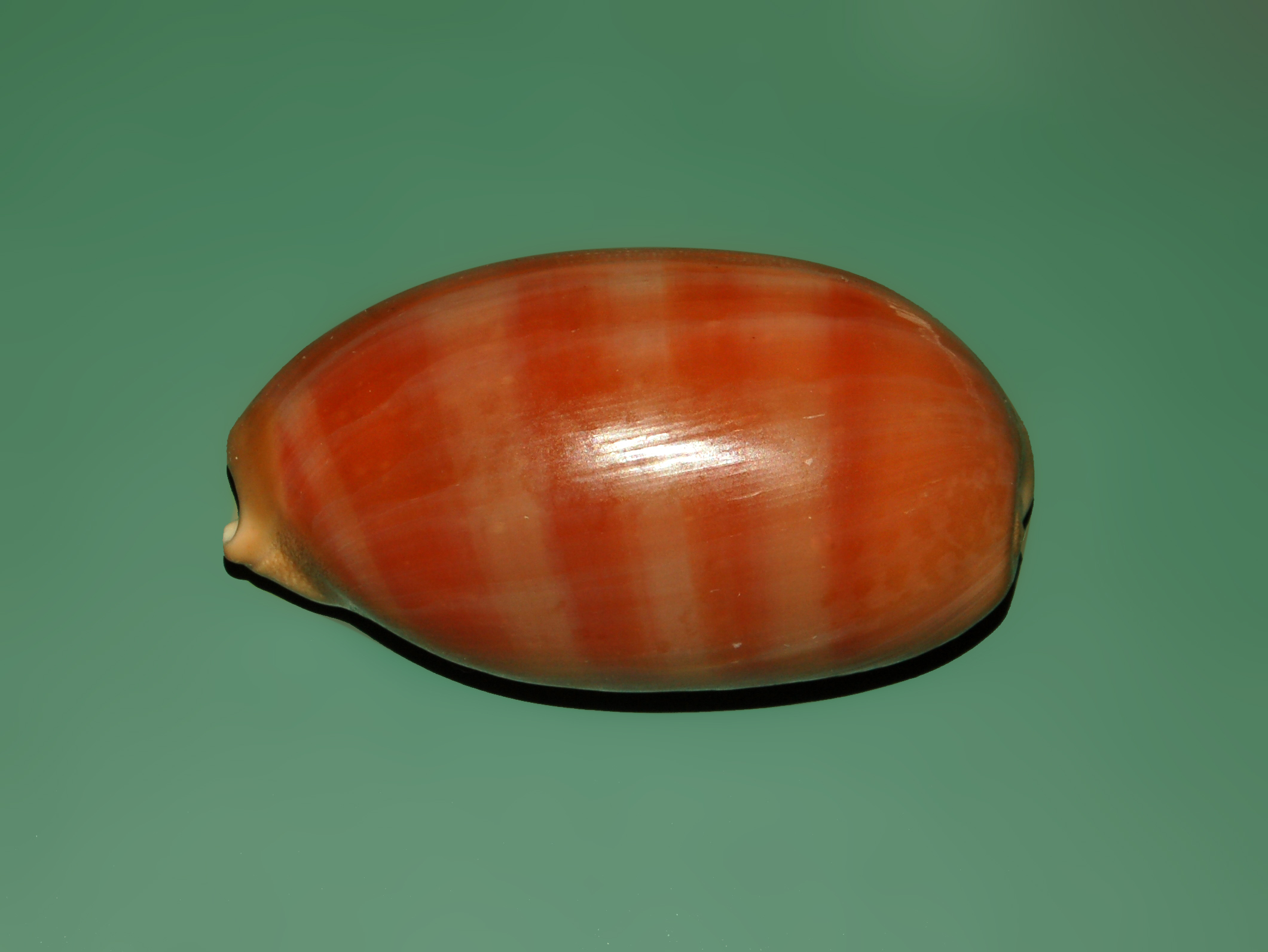
A shell of Lyncina leviathan leviathan from Hawaii, dorsal view, anterior end towards the left

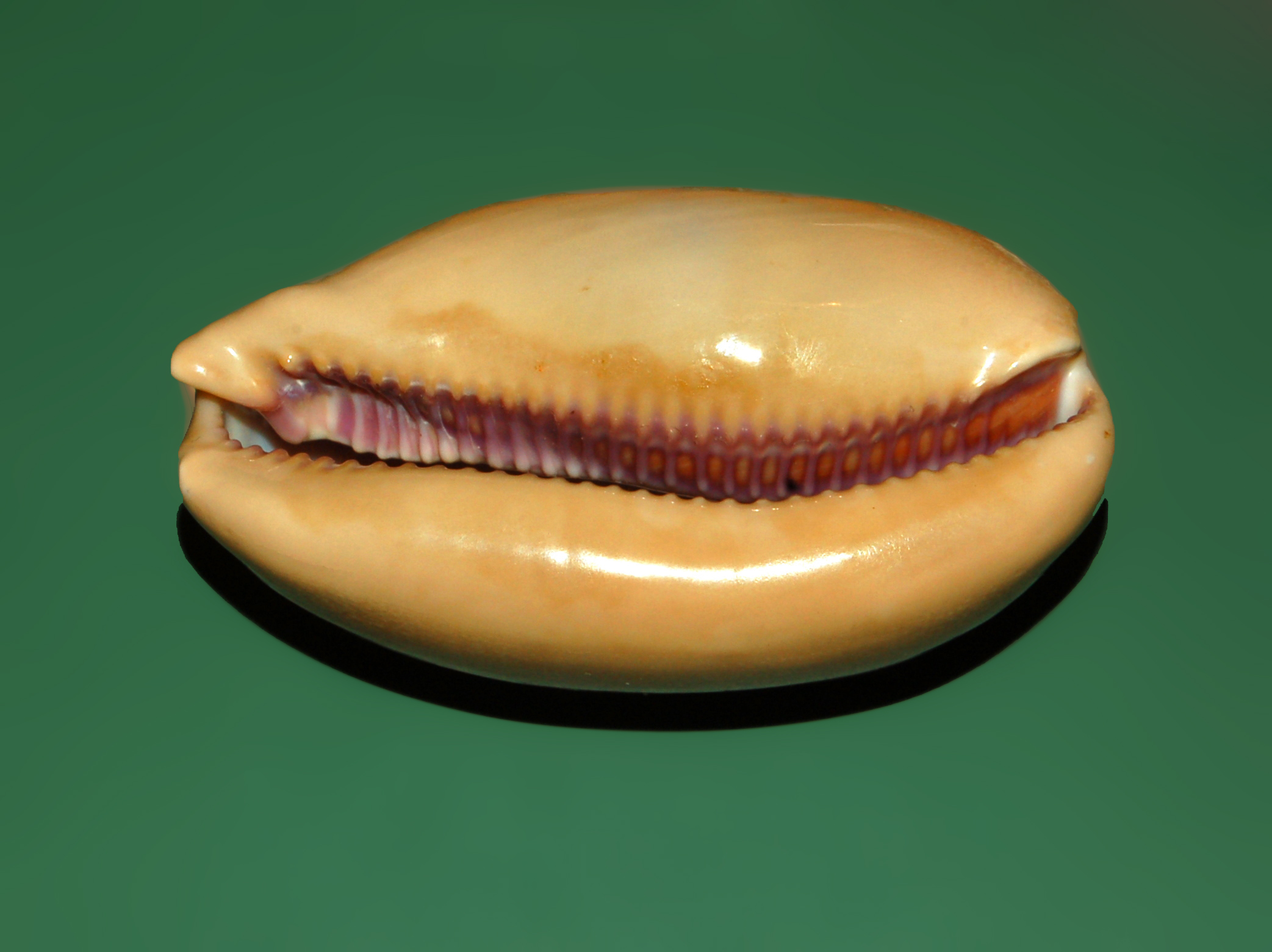
Apertural view of a shell of Lyncina leviathan leviathan

== Distribution ==
Lyncina leviathan is common throughout the tropical Indian (East Africa, Red Sea) and the central Pacific Oceans, in the sea along Thailand, Australia, Polynesia and Hawaii.

== Habitat ==
They inhabit rocky intertidal areas and caves in very shallow water, but they can reach up to 40 metres (130 ft) of depth.

== Subspecies ==
Three subspecies are known:

- Lyncina leviathan leviathan Schilder & Schilder, 1937- leviathan cowry, endemic to Hawaii
- Lyncina leviathan bouteti Burgess & Arnette, 1981- Boutet's leviathan cowry, found throughout Polynesia
- Lyncina leviathan titan Schilder & Schilder, 1962- titanic cowry, found throughout the Indian and central Pacific Oceans

== Bibliography ==
- Cowrie Genetic Database Project
