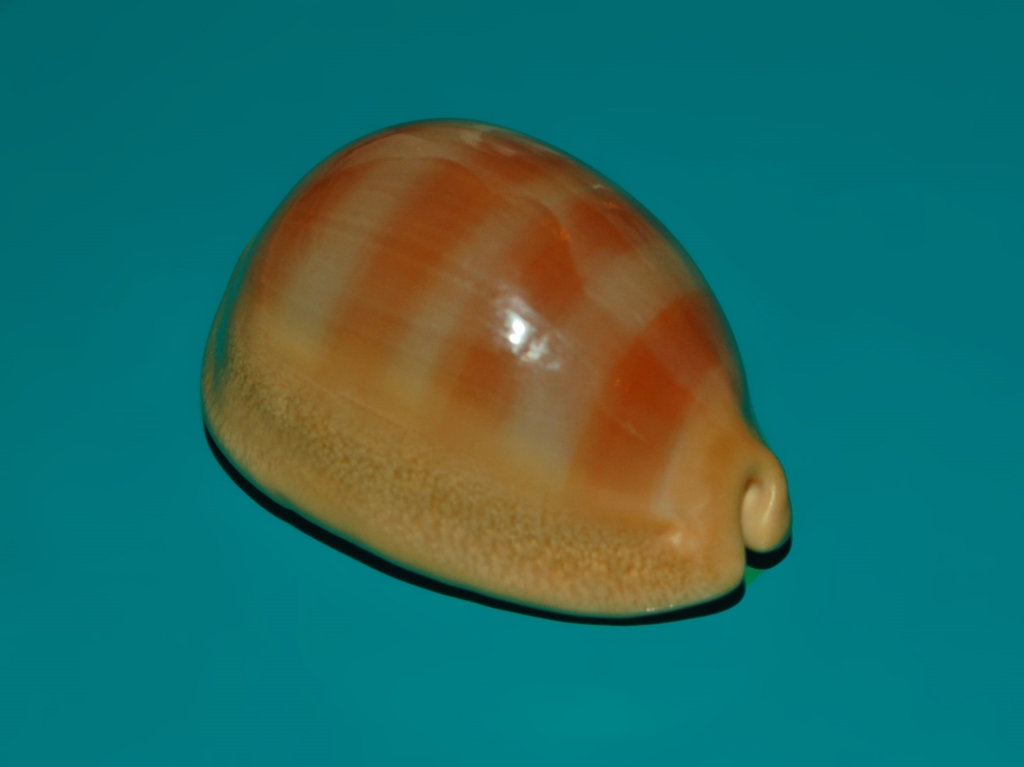
- A shell of Lyncina sulcidentata from Hawaii, anterior end towards the right

Scientific classification
- Kingdom: Animalia
- Phylum: Mollusca
- Class: Gastropoda
- Subclass: Caenogastropoda
- Order: Littorinimorpha
- Family: Cypraeidae
- Genus: Lyncina
- Species: L. sulcidentata

Binomial name
- Lyncina sulcidentata Gray, 1824

Synonyms
- Cypraea sulcidentata Gray, 1824

= Lyncina sulcidentata =

Species of gastropod

Lyncina sulcidentata, common name the square-toothed cowry or groove-toothed cowry, is a species of sea snail, a cowry, a marine gastropod mollusk in the family Cypraeidae, the cowries.

== Description ==
The shells of these quite uncommon cowries reach on average 27–35 millimetres (1.1–1.4 in) of length, with a minimum size of 20 millimetres (0.79 in) and a maximum size of 75 millimetres (3.0 in). The dorsum surface is smooth and shiny, the basic color is reddish or brown-orange, with three wide blue-gray transversal bands. The base is white or light brown, with long teeth furrowing the base (hence the Latin name sulcidentata). The shell is quite similar to Lyncina schilderorum, Lyncina carneola and Lyncina ventriculus. In the living cowries mantle is brownish, with long bluish tree-shaped sensorial papillae. Mantle and foot are well developed, with external antennae. The lateral flaps of the mantle may hide completely the shell surface and may be quickly retracted into the shell.

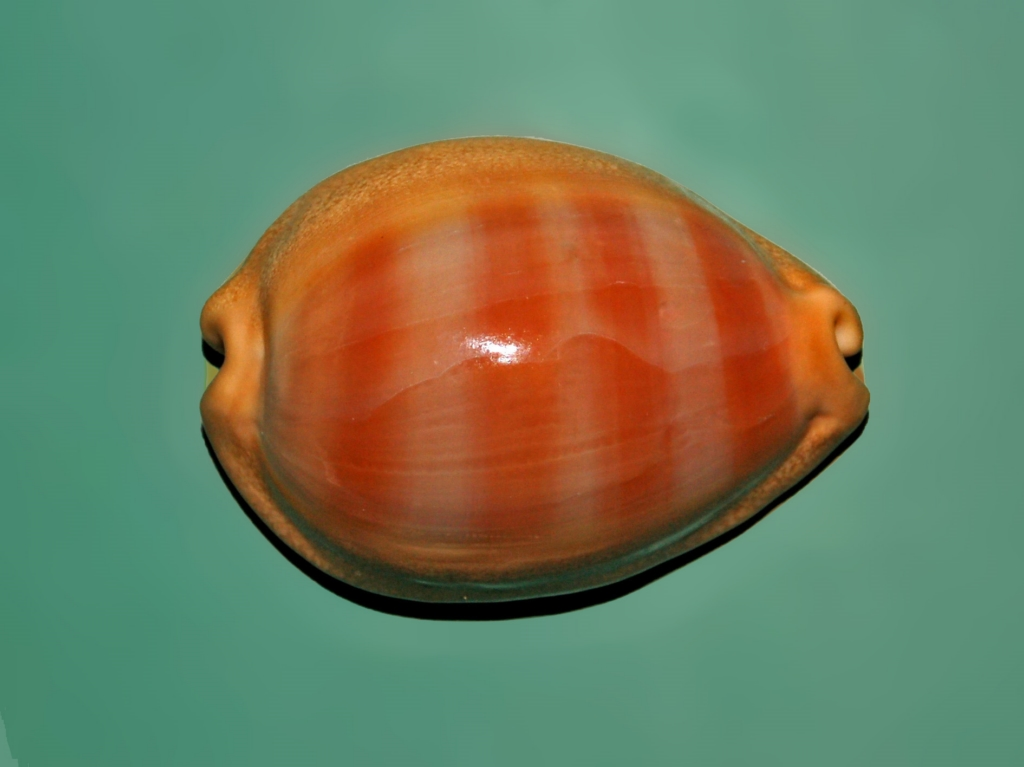
A shell of Lyncina sulcidentata from Hawaii, dorsal view, anterior end towards the right

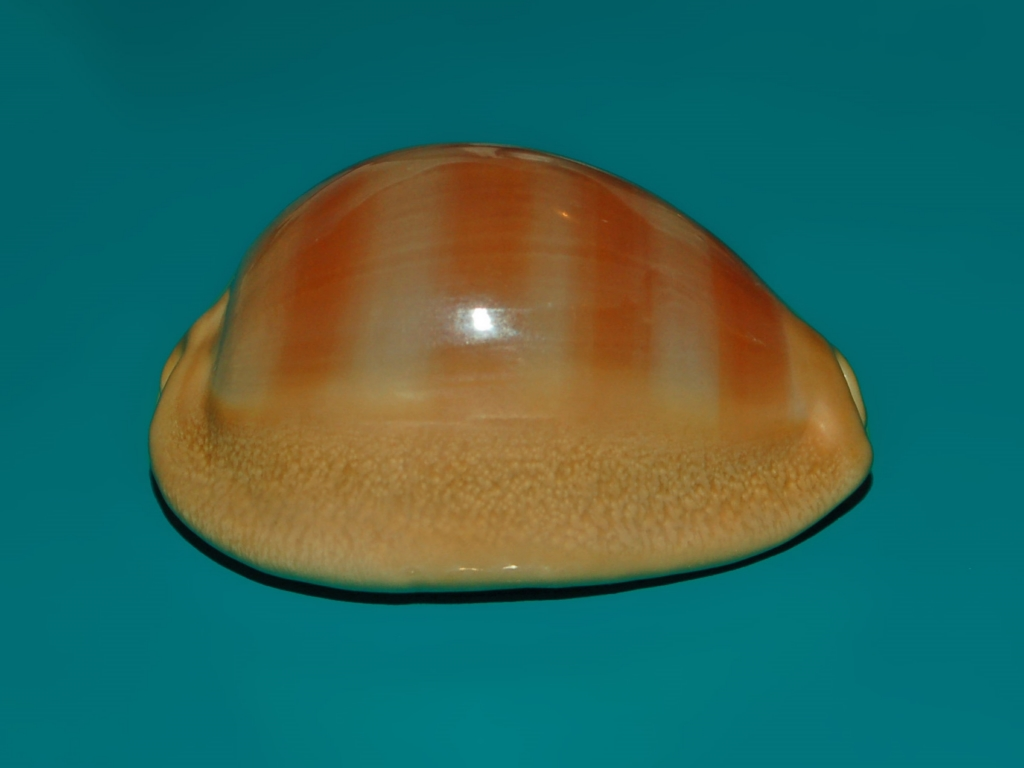
A shell of Lyncina sulcidentata from Hawaii, lateral view, anterior end towards the right

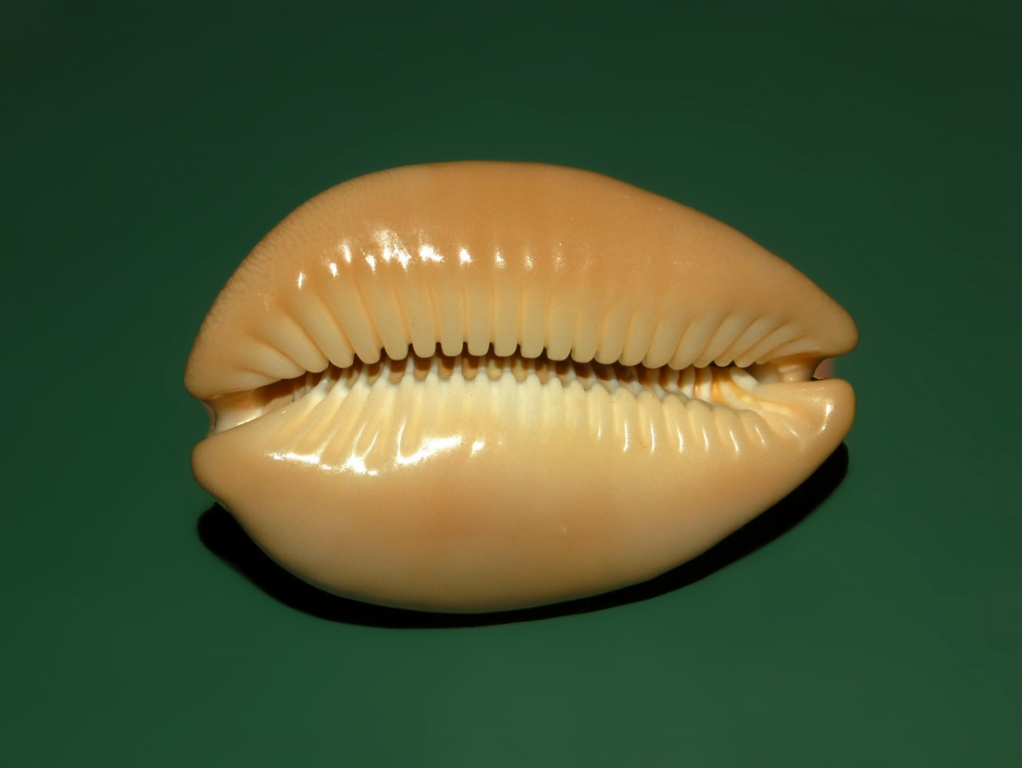
A shell of Lyncina sulcidentata from Hawaii, apertural view, anterior end towards the right

== Distribution ==
This species is endemic to the Hawaiian Islands.

== Habitat ==
These cowries live on coral reef in tropical intertidal and subtidal water up to 40 metres. They can be found in ledges and small coral caves at night, as they start feeding only at dusk.

== Subspecies ==
- Cypraea sulcidentata var. xanthochrysa Melvill, 1888
