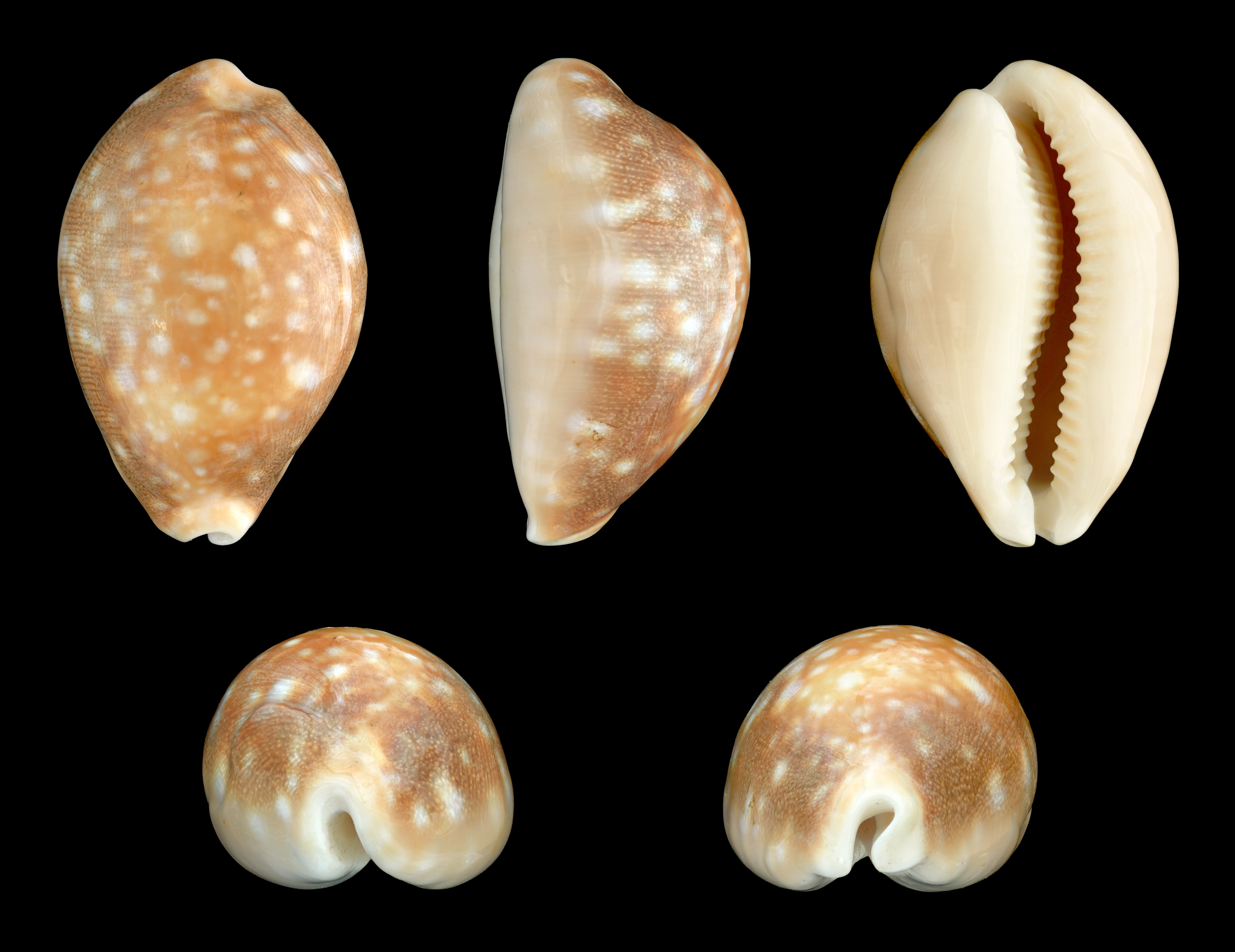
- Five views of a shell of Lyncina vitellus

Scientific classification
- Kingdom: Animalia
- Phylum: Mollusca
- Class: Gastropoda
- Subclass: Caenogastropoda
- Order: Littorinimorpha
- Family: Cypraeidae
- Genus: Lyncina
- Species: L. vitellus

Binomial name
- Lyncina vitellus (Linnaeus, 1758)

Synonyms
- Cypraea vitellus Linnaeus, 1758 (basionym); Lyncina vitellus polynesiae Schilder & Schilder, 1939

= Lyncina vitellus =

Species of gastropod

Lyncina vitellus, common name : the calf cowry or the Pacific deer cowry, is a species of sea snail, a cowry, a marine gastropod mollusk in the family Cypraeidae, the cowries.

== Subspecies and formae ==
- Lyncina vitellus dama (Perry, 1811)
- Lyncina vitellus polynesiae Schilder & Schilder 1939
- Lyncina vitellus vitellus orcina Iredale, 1931

== Description ==
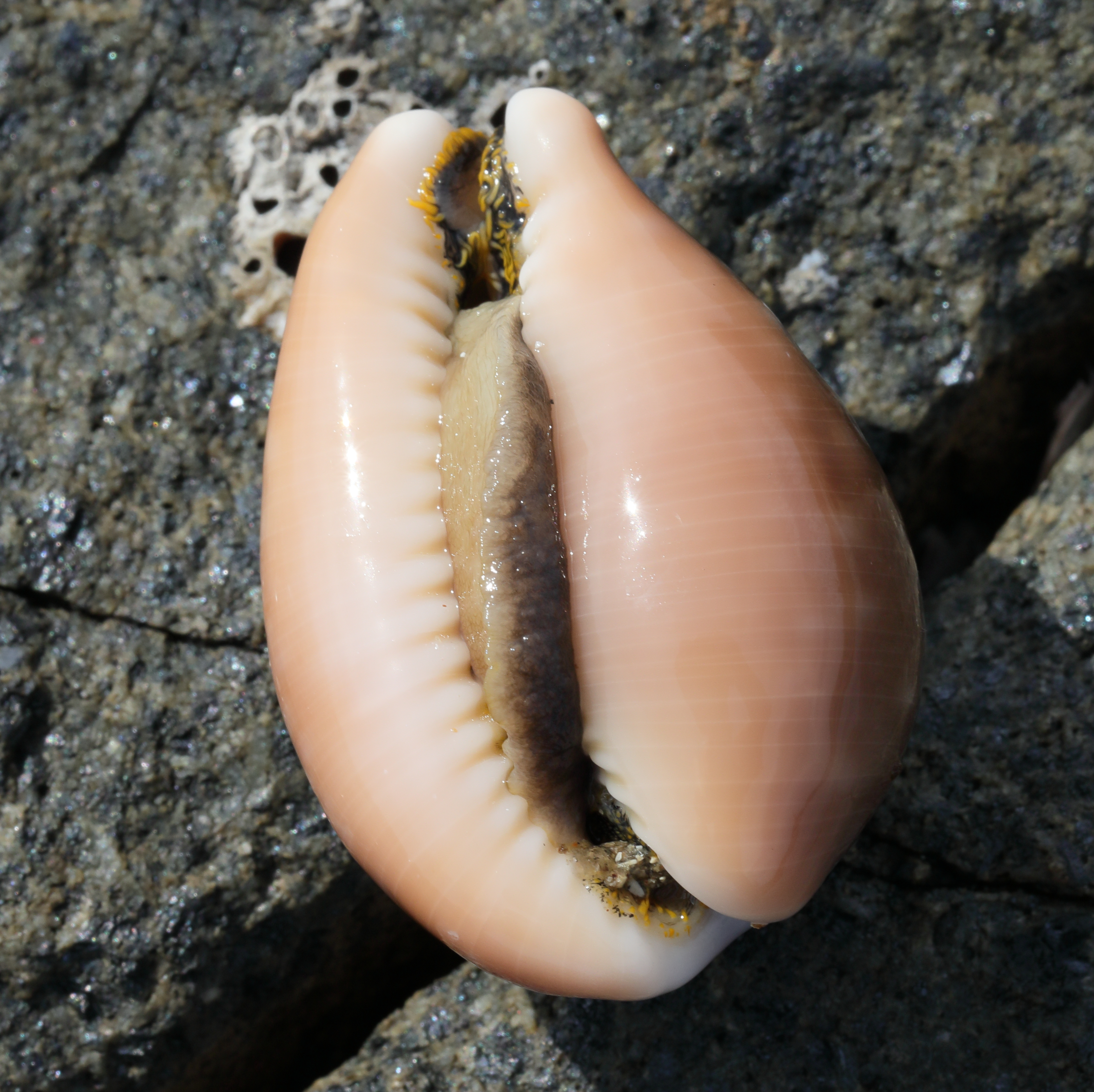
underside of a living Lyncina vitellus

The shells of these very common cowries reach on average 35–45 millimetres (1.4–1.8 in) of length, with a minimum size of 20 millimetres (0.79 in) and a maximum size of 100 millimetres (3.9 in). The shape is usually pear-shaped, the dorsum surface is smooth and shiny and may be pale or dark brown, with several small white spots. The margins and the extremities are clearer, while the base is generally white, with a wide sinuous aperture and long labial teeth. The margins show also numerous thin vertical whitish lines. The juvenile forms have two-three clearer trasversal bands on the shell dorsum. These shells are quite similar and may be confused with the shells of Lyncina camelopardalis. In the living cowries the mantle is grey-brown and almost transparent, with long whitish tree-shaped papillae. Mantle and foot are very well developed, usually with external antennae.

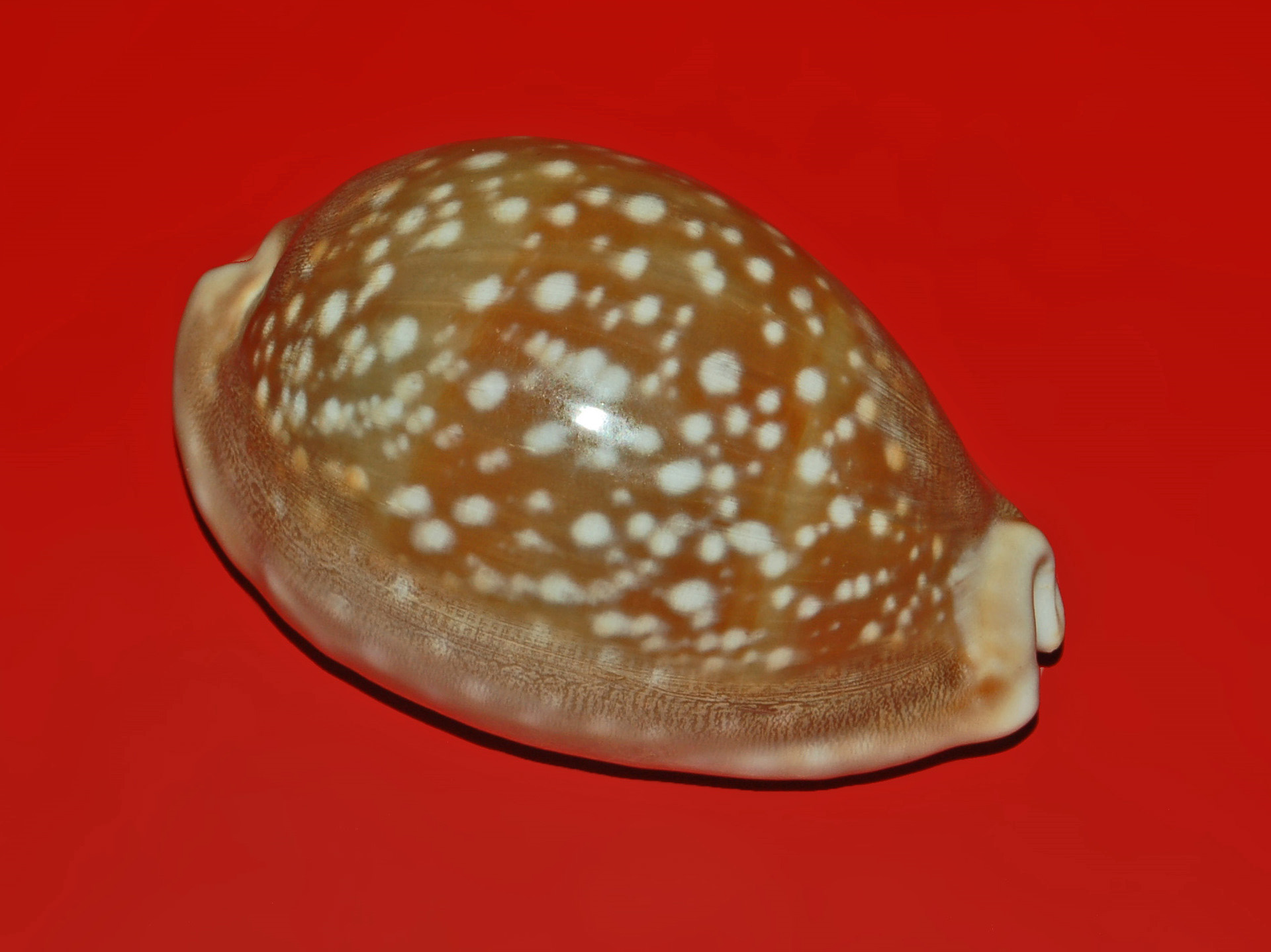
A shell of Lyncina vitellus, anterior end towards the right

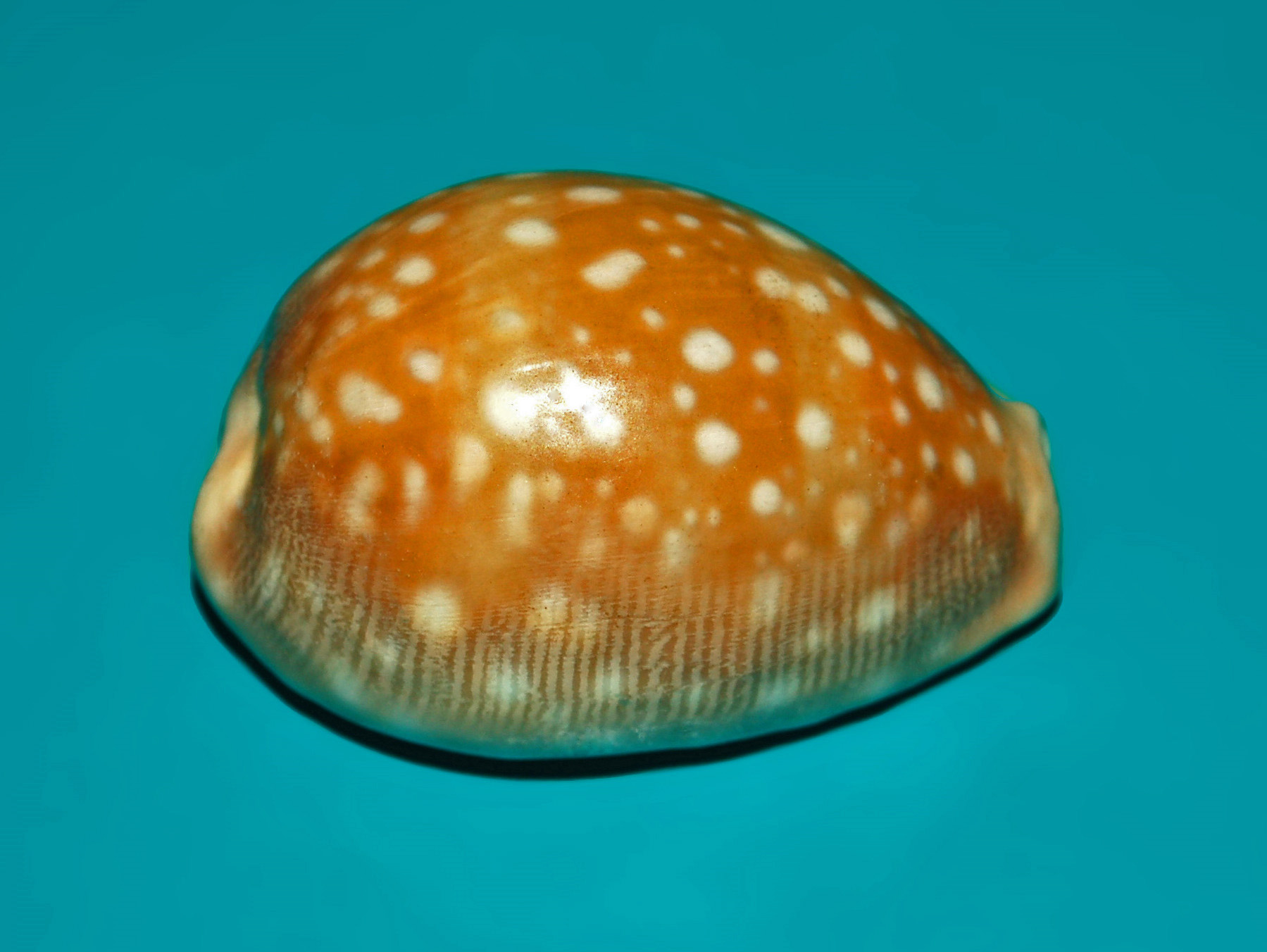
A shell of Lyncina vitellus, dorsal view, anterior end towards the right

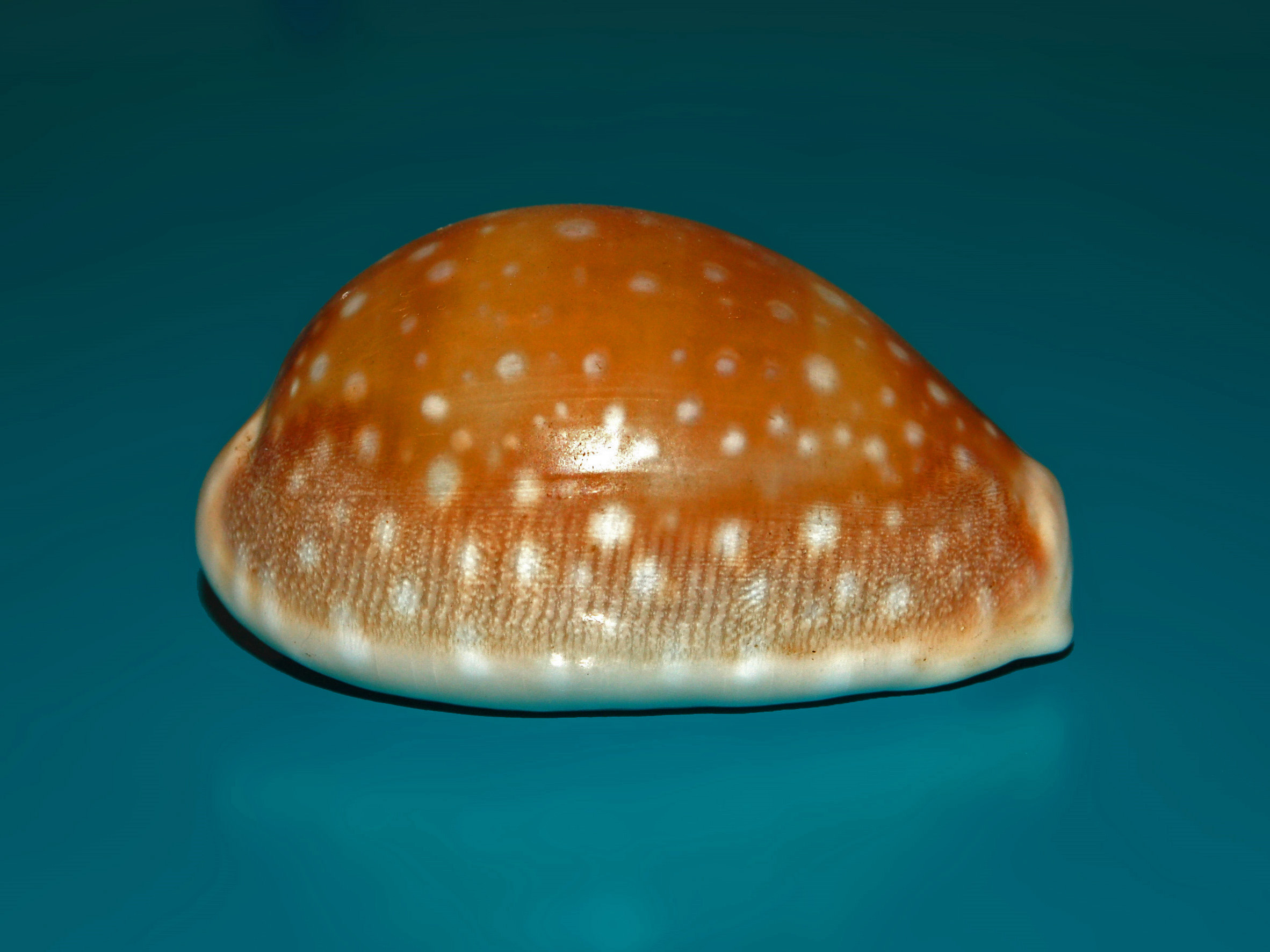
A shell of Lyncina vitellus, lateral view, anterior end towards the right

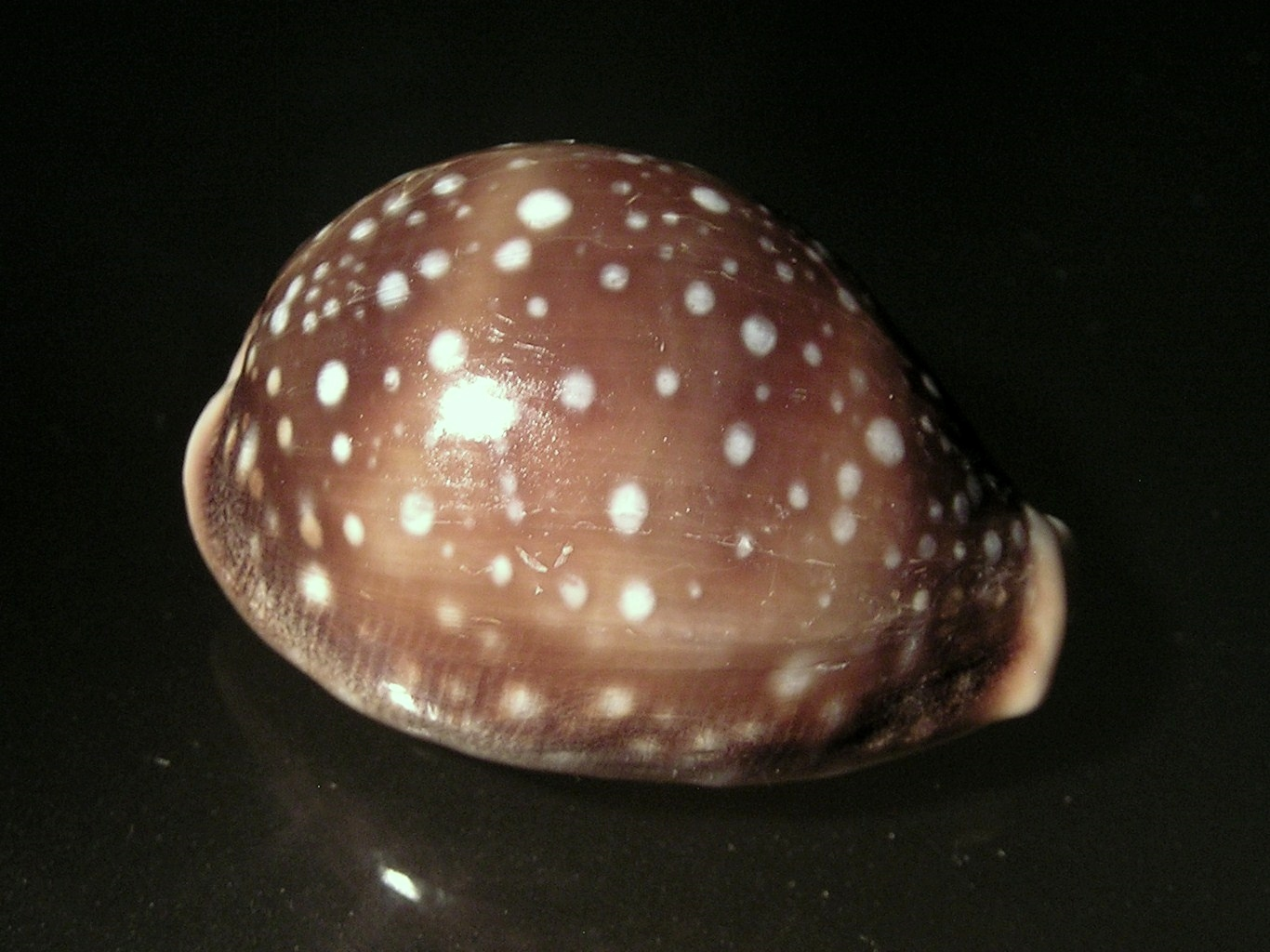
A shell of Lyncina vitellus polynesiae, lateral view, anterior end towards the right

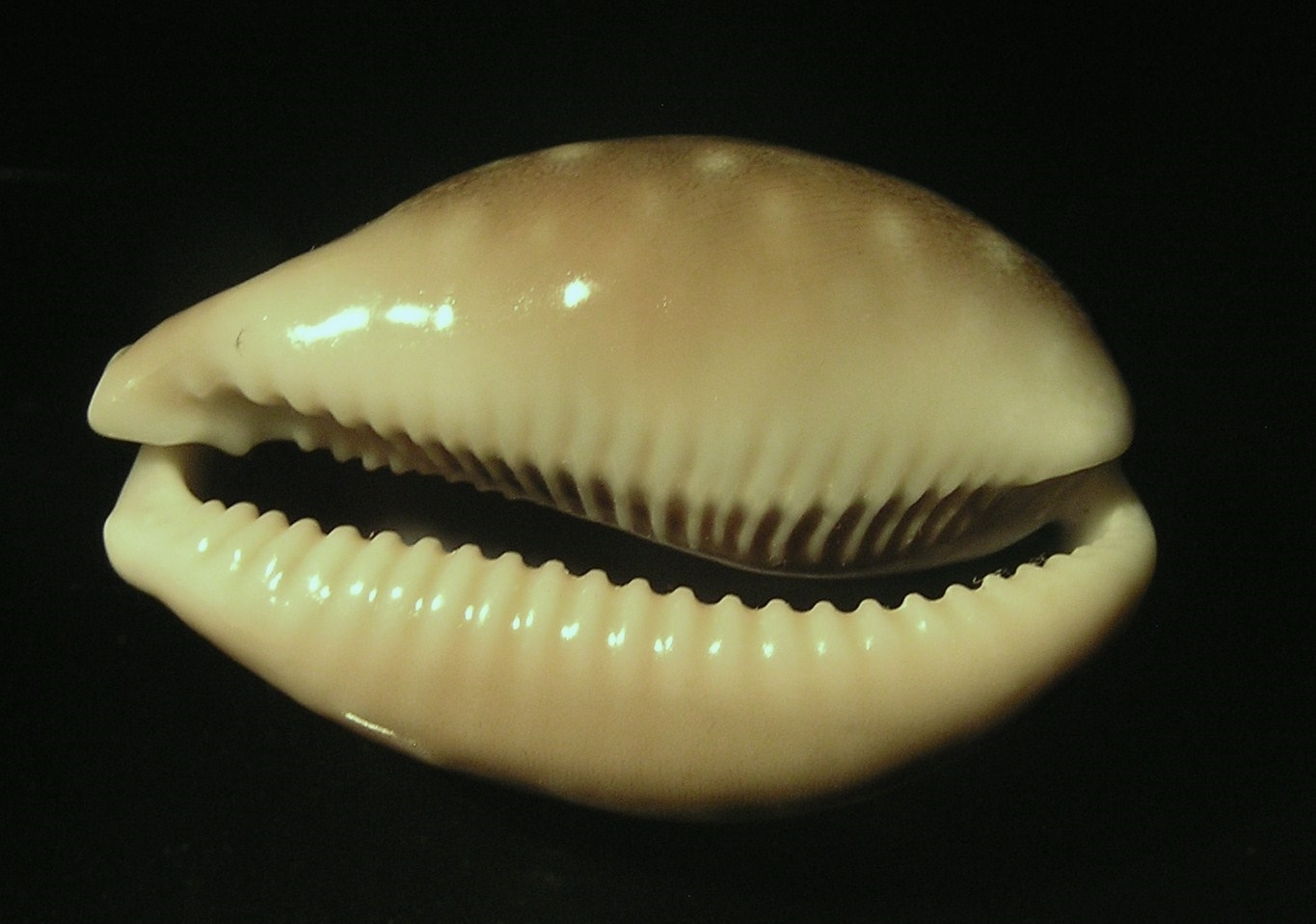
A shell of Lyncina vitellus polynesiae, ventral view, anterior end towards the left

== Distribution ==
This species is distributed in the Red Sea and in the Indian Ocean along Aldabra, Chagos, the Comores, Kenya, Madagascar, the Mascarene Basin, Mauritius, Mozambique, Réunion, the Seychelles, Somalia and Tanzania and also along Jeju Island, Philippines, Palau Islands, Samoa Islands, Polynesia, Hawaii and Vietnam.

== Habitat ==
They live in tropical intertidal and subtidal water at about 0–25 metres (0–82 ft)of depth on coral reef, usually under coral slabs and stones.
