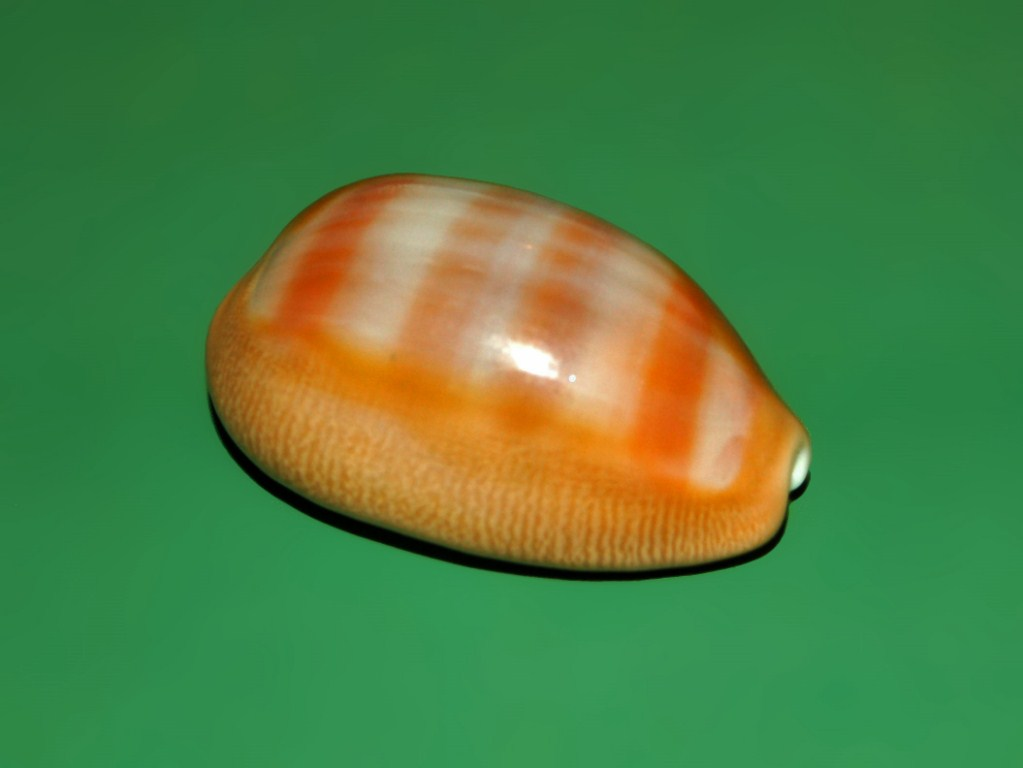
- A shell of Lyncina schilderorum from Hawaii, anterior end towards the right

Scientific classification
- Kingdom: Animalia
- Phylum: Mollusca
- Class: Gastropoda
- Subclass: Caenogastropoda
- Order: Littorinimorpha
- Family: Cypraeidae
- Genus: Lyncina
- Species: L. schilderorum

Binomial name
- Lyncina schilderorum Iredale, 1939

Synonyms
- Cypraea schilderorum Iredale, 1939

= Lyncina schilderorum =

Species of mollusc

Lyncina schilderorum, common names the sandy cowry or Schilder's cowry, is a species of sea snail, a cowry, a marine gastropod mollusk in the family Cypraeidae, the cowries. This species was named in honor of Franz and Maria Schilder, two German cowry biologists (hence the Latin name Schilderorum, meaning Schilders' ).

== Description ==
The shells of these quite uncommon cowries reach on average 28–33 millimetres (1.1–1.3 in) of length, with a minimum size of 22 millimetres (0.87 in) and a maximum size of 43 millimetres (1.7 in). The surface is smooth and shiny, their basic color is brown-orange, with 3-5 wide light blue transversal bands. The base is whitish or bluish, with fine white teeth. The shell is quite similar to Lyncina sulcidentata, Lyncina carneola and Lyncina ventriculus. In the living cowries mantle is whitish, with long tree-shaped sensorial papillae. Mantle and foot are well developed, with external antennae. The lateral flaps of the mantle may hide completely the shell surface and may be quickly retracted into the shell opening.

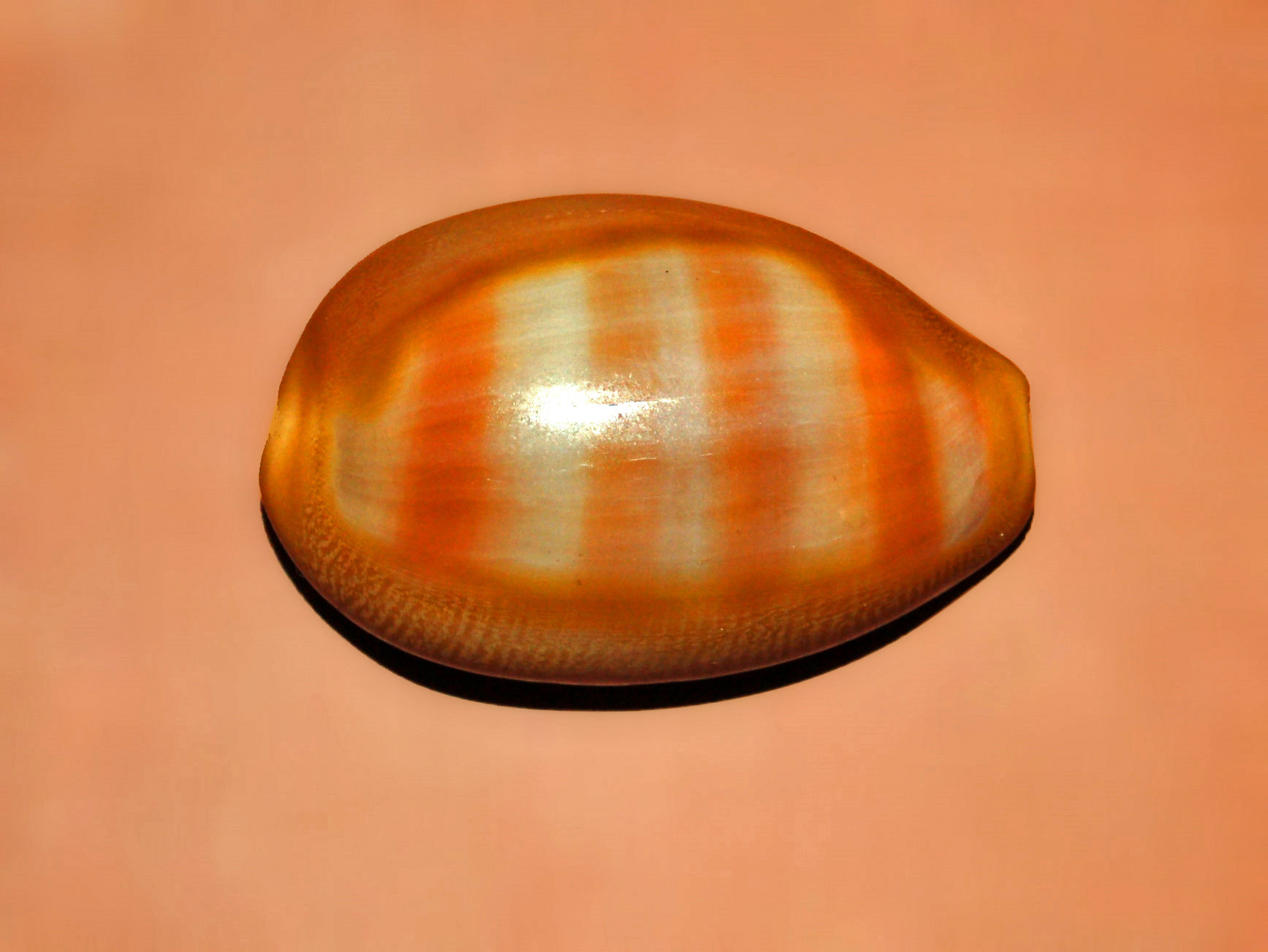
A shell of Lyncina schilderorum from Hawaii, dorsal view, anterior end towards the right

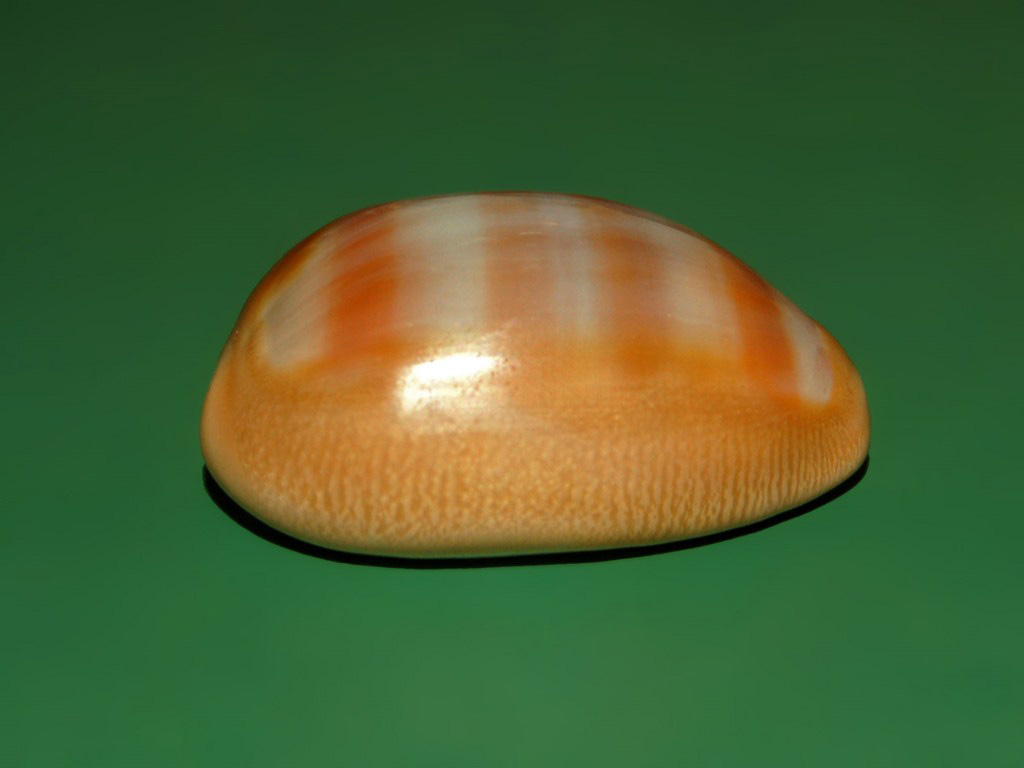
A shell of Lyncina schilderorum from Hawaii, lateral view, anterior end towards the right

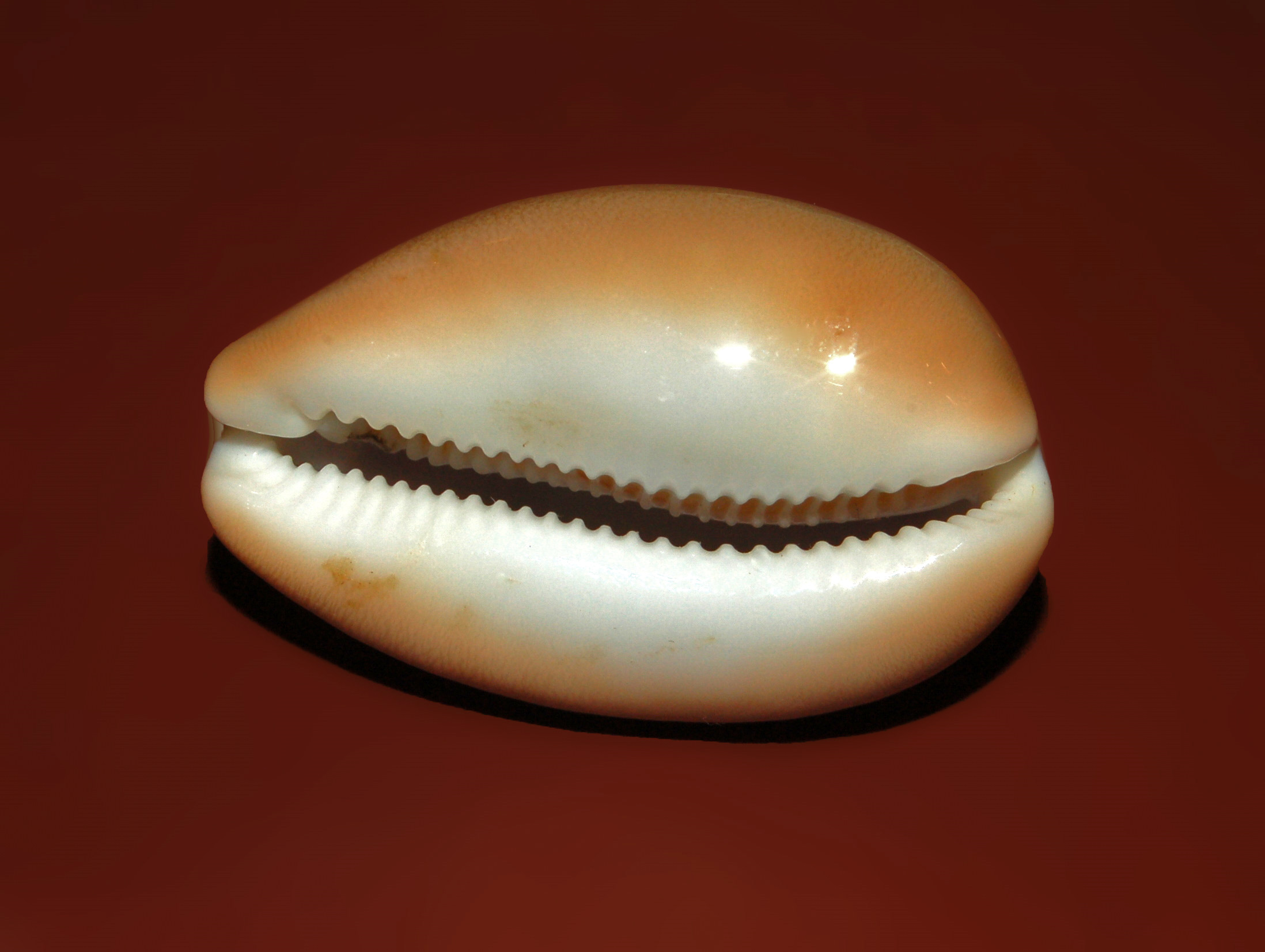
A shell of Lyncina schilderorum from Hawaii, apertural view, anterior end towards the left

== Distribution ==
This species occurs in the northern and central Pacific Ocean, in the seas along the Philippines, Melanesia, Guam, Micronesia, Polynesia, Tuamotu Islands and Hawaii, excluding the Galapagos.

== Habitat ==
These cowries mainly live in tropical intertidal waters, usually at 2–10 metres (6 ft 7 in – 32 ft 10 in) of depth, hidden under rocks or coral slabs during the day. At night they can be found on the reef or small caves, feeding on sponges or corals.
