= Callistocypraea leucodon =

Scientific classification
- Domain: Eukaryota
- Kingdom: Animalia
- Phylum: Mollusca
- Class: Gastropoda
- Subclass: Caenogastropoda
- Order: Littorinimorpha
- Family: Cypraeidae
- Genus: Callistocypraea
- Species: C. leucodon

Binomial name
- Callistocypraea leucodon Broderip, 1827

Subspecies
- Callistocypraea leucodon leucodon (Broderip, 1828); Callistocypraea leucodon tenuidon (Lorenz, 1999)

Species of gastropod

Callistocypraea leucodon, common name the white-toothed cowry, is a rare cowry, a species of sea snail, or marine gastropod mollusk in the family Cypraeidae, the cowries.

This species can be found from the Philippines and New Guinea to the Indian Ocean.

== History ==
Until the late 1960s, this species was known from only two specimens: one in the National Museum of London, England, and one in the Harvard University Museum of Comparative Zoology. In the late 1960s and early 1970s the third and fourth specimens were found.

By the 1980s, they were being found with regular frequency, and were available on the market for about $5000. By 2000, they were "common" enough to be available for about $1500 in "gem" condition, and less than $1000 for lower quality specimens.

== Description ==
The color of the shell of the white-toothed cowry varies from a chocolate-brown to butterscotch with whitish spots of varying size and degrees of contrast. The dorsal mantle stripe is very distinctive in this species.

The living animal has a mottled (blackish-brown and light tan) mantle with short and long colorless papillae, a blackish siphon and tan foot. A number of subspecies and forms have been described including: C. leucodon leucodon (pyriform nominate); angioyna (slight tooth differences); tenuidon (smaller, heavily spotted and rounder); and escotoi (small, dark and very round).

== Bibliography ==
- Cowrie Genetic Database Project
