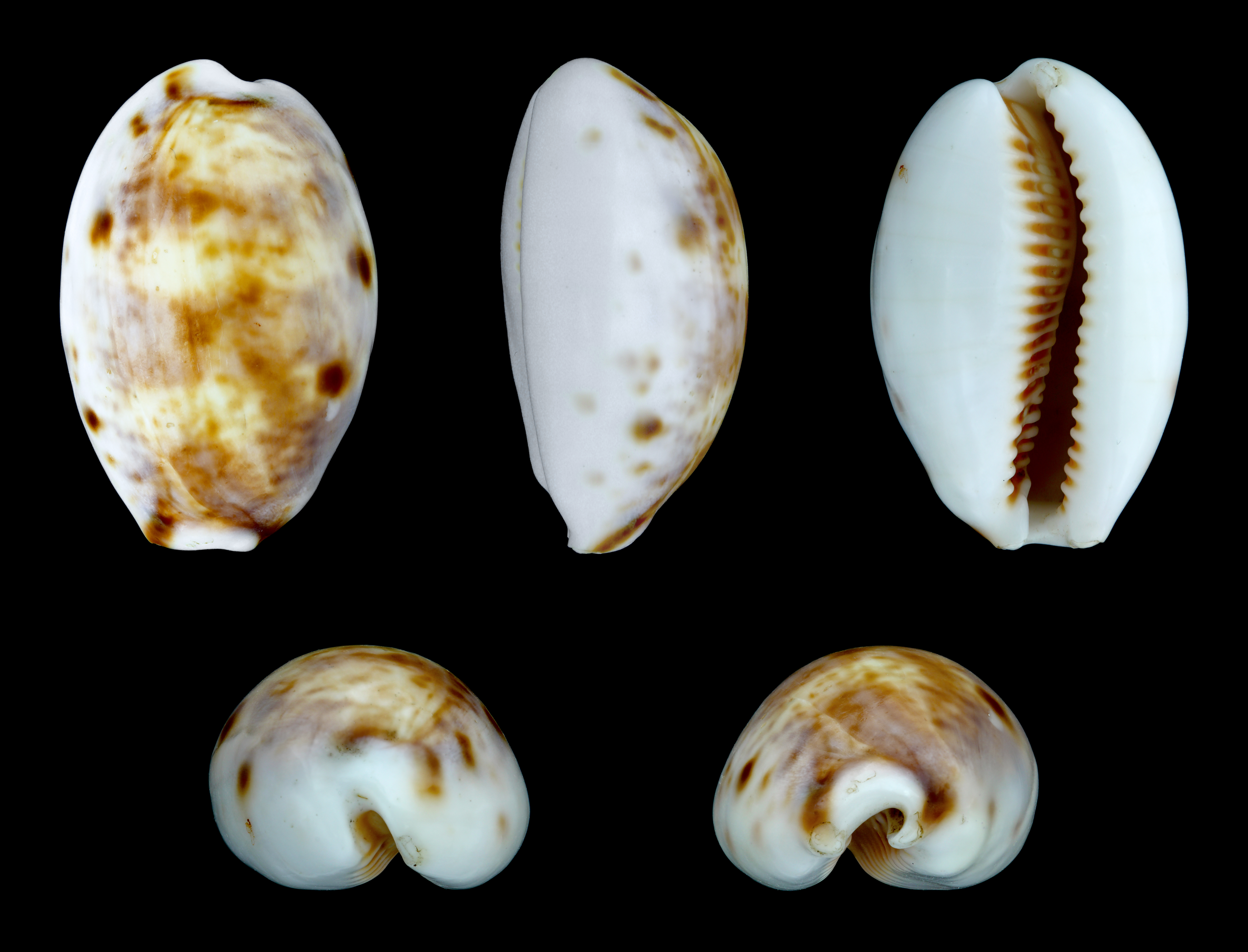
- Five views of a shell of Lyncina lynx
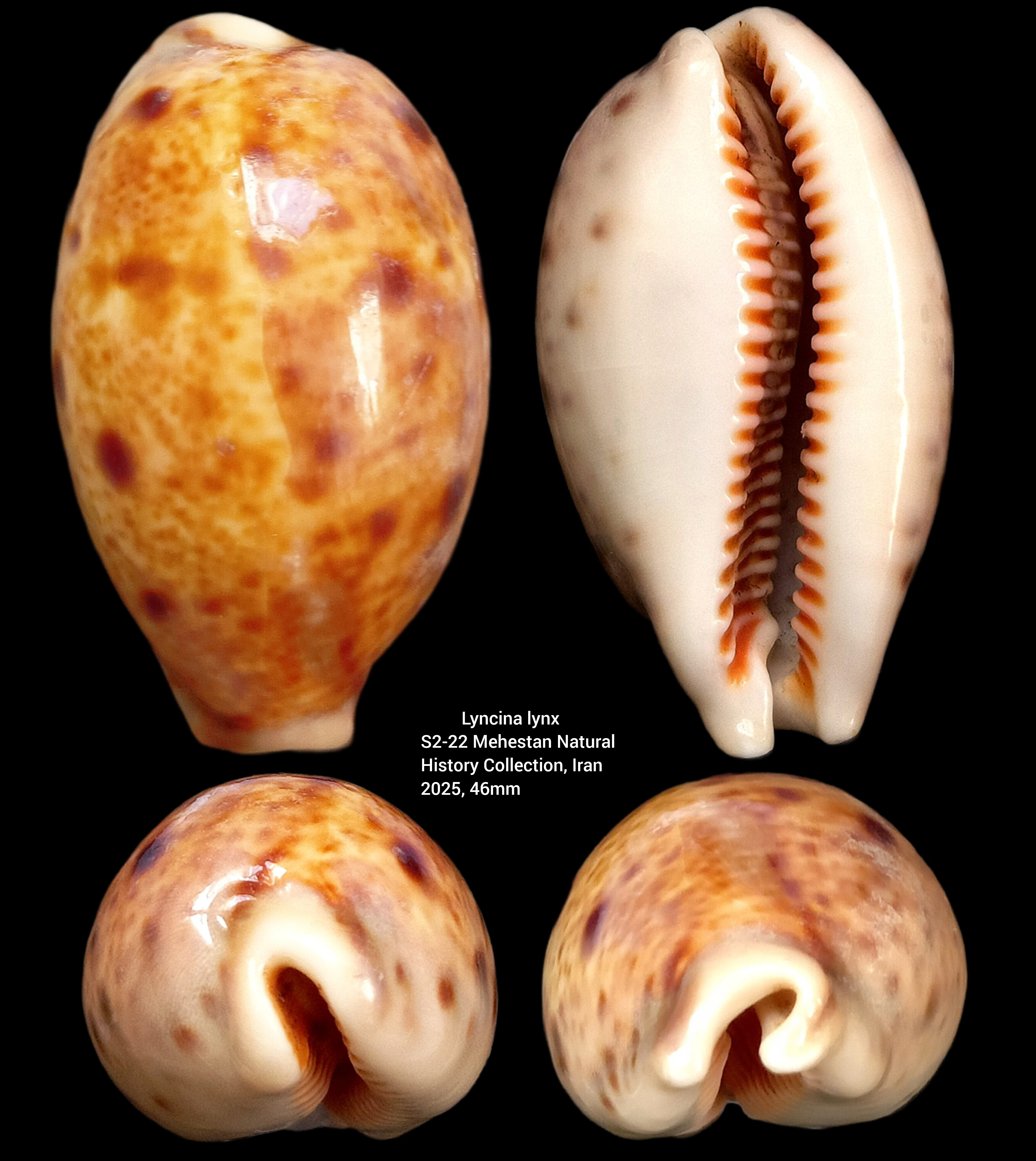
- Lyncina lynx S2-22 46mm

Scientific classification
- Kingdom: Animalia
- Phylum: Mollusca
- Class: Gastropoda
- Subclass: Caenogastropoda
- Order: Littorinimorpha
- Family: Cypraeidae
- Genus: Lyncina
- Species: L. lynx

Binomial name
- Lyncina lynx (Linnaeus, 1758)

Synonyms
- Cypraea globosa; Cypraea lynx, Linnaeus, 1758 (basionym); Cypraea vanelli (Linnaeus, 1758); Cypraea leucostoma Gmelin, 1791; Cypraea subflava Gmelin, 1791; Cypraea punctulata Gmelin, 1791; Cypraea squalina Gmelin, 1791; Cypraea cruentata Röding, 1798; Cypraea ferruginea Fischer, 1807; Cypraea caledonica Crosse, 1869

= Lyncina lynx =

Species of gastropod

Lyncina lynx, common name : the lynx cowry or eyed cowry, is a species of sea snail, a cowry, a marine gastropod mollusk in the family Cypraeidae, the cowries.

== Description ==
Lyncina lynx is quite common. The shells of these cowries are very variabile in pattern and size. They reach on average 38–50 millimetres (1.5–2.0 in) of length, with a minimum size of 18 millimetres (0.71 in) and a maximum size of 90 millimetres (3.5 in). The dorsum surface of these smooth and shiny shells is generally pale brown, pale purple or grey, densely covered with small and large dark brown or purple dots. The large spots are extended to the edges. The base is white or pale brown. The aperture is long and narrow, with several white teeth and a bright reddish spacing. In the living cowries the mantle is transparent, with tree-shaped white sensorial papillae and may cover the entire shell.

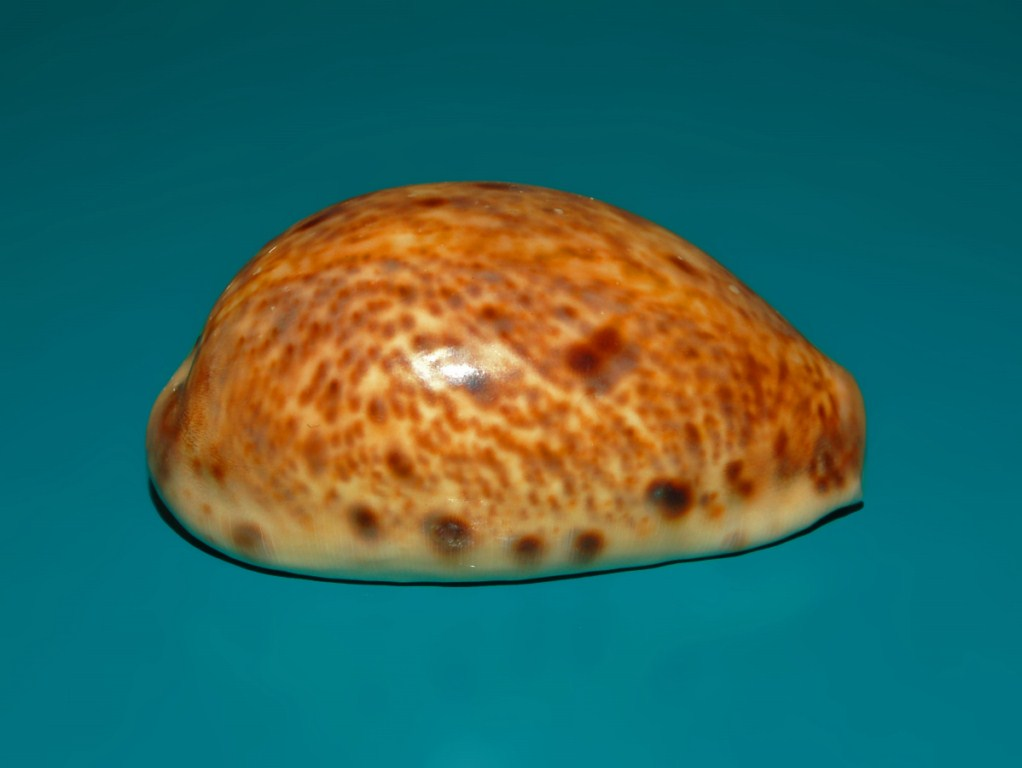
Shell of Lyncina lynx

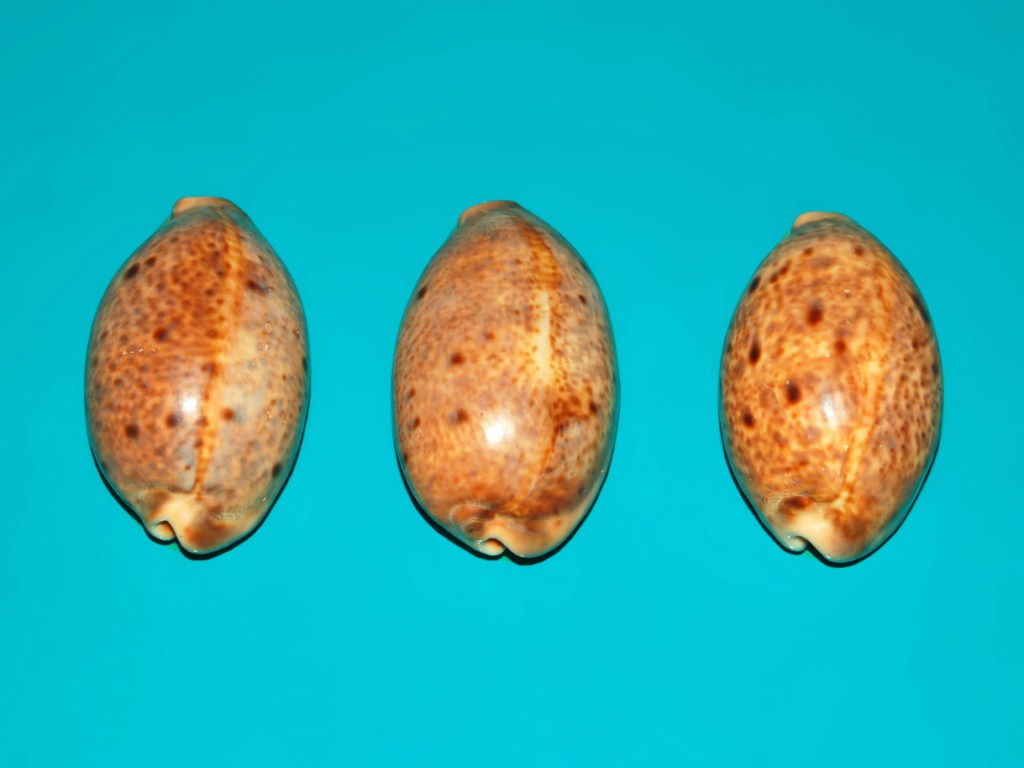
Three shells of Lyncina lynx

== Distribution ==
This species occurs in the Red Sea, in the Indian Ocean along South-East Africa (Aldabra, Chagos, Kenya, Madagascar, the Mascarene Basin, Mauritius, Réunion, the Seychelles, Zanzibar and Tanzania) and in the western Pacific Ocean (Philippines, Japan, Taiwan, western and northern Australia, Polynesia and Hawaii).

== Habitat ==
These cowries live in tropical shallow water, subtidal and intertidal, usually under rocks or corals up to about 10 metres (33 ft)of depth. They start feeding at dusk, mainly on sponges.

== Subspecies ==
- Cypraea lynx var. williamsi Melvill, 1888
- Cypraea (Luponia) lynx globosa Dautzenberg, 1902
- Cypraea lynx var.michaelis Melvill, 1905
- Cypraea lynx var. incrassata Dautzenberg, 1929
- Lyncina lynx pacifica Steadman & Cotton, 1943
- Cypraea (Lyncina) lynx var. javana Coen, 1949
