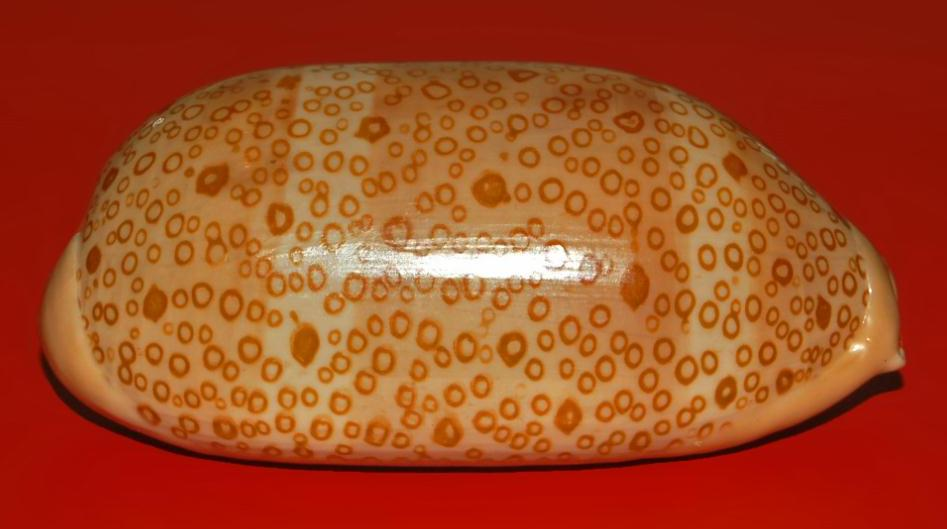
- Arestorides argus

Scientific classification
- Kingdom: Animalia
- Phylum: Mollusca
- Class: Gastropoda
- Subclass: Caenogastropoda
- Order: Littorinimorpha
- Superfamily: Cypraeoidea
- Family: Cypraeidae
- Genus: Arestorides; Iredale, 1930

= Arestorides =

Genus of gastropods

Arestorides is a genus of sea snails, marine gastropod mollusks in the family Cypraeidae, the cowries.

== Species ==
Species within the genus Arestorides include:

- Arestorides argus (Linnaeus, 1758)
