= Golden cowrie =

- Five views of a shell of Callistocypraea aurantium

Scientific classification
- Kingdom: Animalia
- Phylum: Mollusca
- Class: Gastropoda
- Subclass: Caenogastropoda
- Order: Littorinimorpha
- Family: Cypraeidae
- Genus: Callistocypraea
- Species: C. aurantium

Binomial name
- Callistocypraea aurantium (Gmelin, 1791)

Synonyms
- Cypraea aurantium Gmelin, 1791; Cypraea aurora Lamarck, 1810; Lyncina aurantium (Gmelin, 1791)

Species of gastropod

The golden cowrie (Callistocypraea aurantium; Fijian: bulikula or buli kula, pronounced [ᵐbu.liˈku.la]) is a species of cowrie sea snail, a marine gastropod mollusk in the family Cypraeidae. It was formerly classified inside the genus lyncina.

== Distribution ==
This is an uncommon-to-rare species which is found in the tropical waters of the west-central to south-central Pacific Ocean.

== Habitat ==
This animal is usually found on the ocean side of islands, on the reef, at depths of 30 to 100+ feet. It normally hides in the coral during daylight and comes out to feed at night.

== Shell description ==
This is a large cowry, 80 to 100 mm (3.1 to 3.9 in) long. The shell that is yellowish brown to reddish orange on the dorsum, with white to cream colored margins. The mantle of the golden cowry is a combination of dark gray with translucent spots and patches that the orange color of the shell shows through. The scattered branching papillae are brownish gray, often white at the bases and tips.

== Human use ==
In the past, on the Fiji Islands, this shell, known as bulikula, was drilled at the ends and worn on a string around the neck by chieftains as a symbol of rank or privilege. As the shells are rare, they are prized by collectors.
