= Lyncina kuroharai =

Scientific classification
- Kingdom: Animalia
- Phylum: Mollusca
- Class: Gastropoda
- Subclass: Caenogastropoda
- Order: Littorinimorpha
- Family: Cypraeidae
- Genus: Lyncina
- Species: L. kuroharai

Binomial name
- Lyncina kuroharai (Kuroda & Habe, 1961, 1961)

Species of gastropod

Lyncina kuroharai is a species of sea snail, a cowry, a marine gastropod mollusc in the family Cypraeidae, the cowries.
