= Callistocypraea =

Scientific classification
- Kingdom: Animalia
- Phylum: Mollusca
- Class: Gastropoda
- Subclass: Caenogastropoda
- Order: Littorinimorpha
- Superfamily: Cypraeoidea
- Family: Cypraeidae
- Genus: Callistocypraea; Schilder, 1927

Type species
- Cypraea aurantium Gmelin, 1791

Synonyms
- Lyncina (Callistocypraea) Schilder, 1927

Genus of gastropods

Callistocypraea is a genus of sea snails, marine gastropod mollusks in the family Cypraeidae, the cowries.

== Species ==
- Callistocypraea aurantium (Gmelin, 1791)
- Callistocypraea broderipii (J. E. Gray in G. B. Sowerby I, 1832)
- Callistocypraea leucodon (Broderip, 1828)
- Callistocypraea nivosa (Broderip, 1827)

Species brought into synonymy

- †Callistocypraea peyroti Schilder, 1932: synonym of † Lyncina peyroti (Schilder, 1932) (original combination)
- Callistocypraea testudinaria (Linnaeus): synonym of Chelycypraea testudinaria (Linnaeus, 1758)
