= Callistocypraea broderipii =

Scientific classification
- Kingdom: Animalia
- Phylum: Mollusca
- Class: Gastropoda
- Subclass: Caenogastropoda
- Order: Littorinimorpha
- Family: Cypraeidae
- Genus: Callistocypraea
- Species: C. broderipii

Binomial name
- Callistocypraea broderipii (Gray in Sowerby, 1832)

Synonyms
- Cypraea broderipii Gray in Sowerby, 1832; Lyncina broderipii (Gray, 1832)

Species of gastropod

Callistocypraea broderipii is a species of sea snail, a cowry, a marine gastropod mollusk in the family Cypraeidae, the cowries.

== Description ==
Callistocypraea broderipii are typically between 60mm and 90mm in length.

== Distribution ==
This species occurs in the Indian Ocean along Madagascar and Mauritius.
