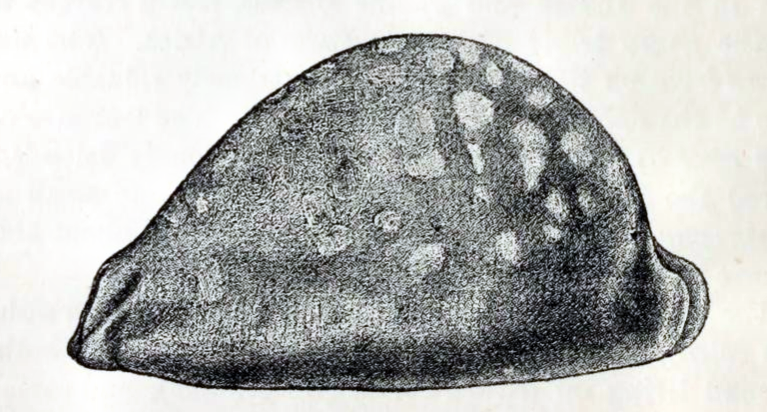
- Drawing of a top view of the shell of Lyncina leucodon

Scientific classification
- Kingdom: Animalia
- Phylum: Mollusca
- Class: Gastropoda
- Subclass: Caenogastropoda
- Order: Littorinimorpha
- Family: Cypraeidae
- Genus: Lyncina
- Species: L. leucodon

Binomial name
- Lyncina leucodon (Broderip, 1832)

Synonyms
- Cypraea leucodon Broderip, 1828 (original combination); Cypraea leucodon leucodon Broderip, 1828; Cypraea leucodon leucodon var. escotoi Poppe, 2004 (Unavailable name: established as a variety after 1960)

= Lyncina leucodon =

Species of gastropod

Lyncina leucodon, common name the white-toothed cowry, is a species of sea snail, a cowry, a marine gastropod mollusk in the family Cypraeidae, the cowries.

== Description ==
The White-toothed Cowry was known from only two specimens until rather recently (one in the National Museum of London, England and one in the Harvard University Museum of Comparative Zoology). The distinctiveness of the shell was easily enough to consider it a new species. In the late 1960s and early 1970s the third and fourth specimens were found. By the 1980s, they were being found with regular frequency and were available on the market for about $5000. By 2000, they were common enough to be available for about $1500 in gem state and less than $1000 for lower quality specimens. The color of the White-toothed Cowry varies from a chocolate-brown to butterscotch with whitish spots of varying size and contrast. The dorsal mantle stripe is very distinctive to the species. The living animal has a mottled (blackish-brown and light tan) mantle with short and long colorless papillae, a blackish siphon and tan foot. A number of subspecies and forms have been described including: leucodon (pyriform nominate); angioyna (slight tooth differences); tenuidon (smaller, heavily spotted and rounder); and escotoi (small, dark and very round).
