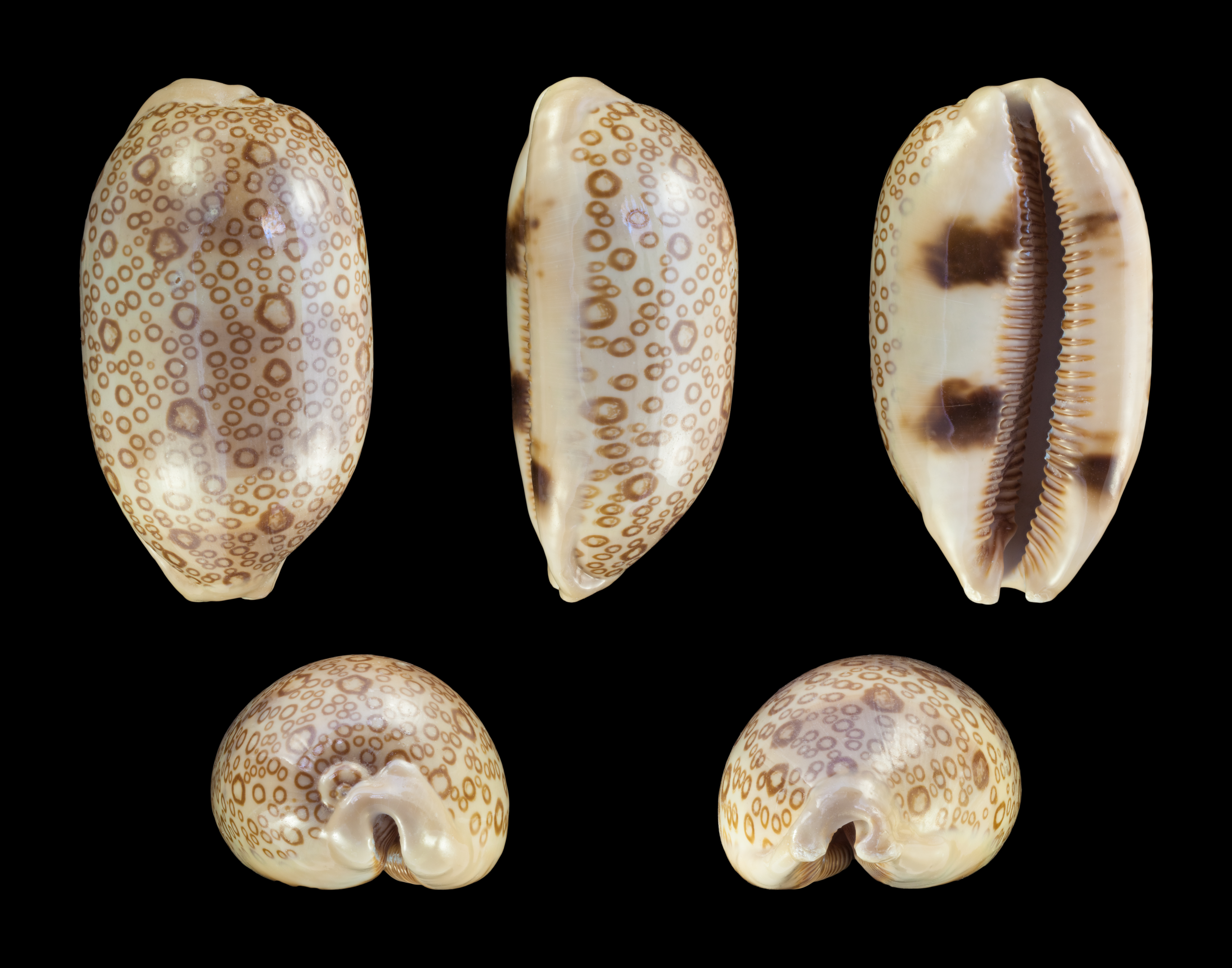

Scientific classification
- Kingdom: Animalia
- Phylum: Mollusca
- Class: Gastropoda
- Subclass: Caenogastropoda
- Order: Littorinimorpha
- Family: Cypraeidae
- Genus: Arestorides
- Species: A. argus

Binomial name
- Arestorides argus (Linnaeus, 1758)

Synonyms
- Cypraea argus Linnaeus, 1758 (basionym); Lyncina argus (Linnaeus, 1758); Talparia argus (Linnaeus, 1758)

= Arestorides argus =

Eyed cowrie

Species of gastropod

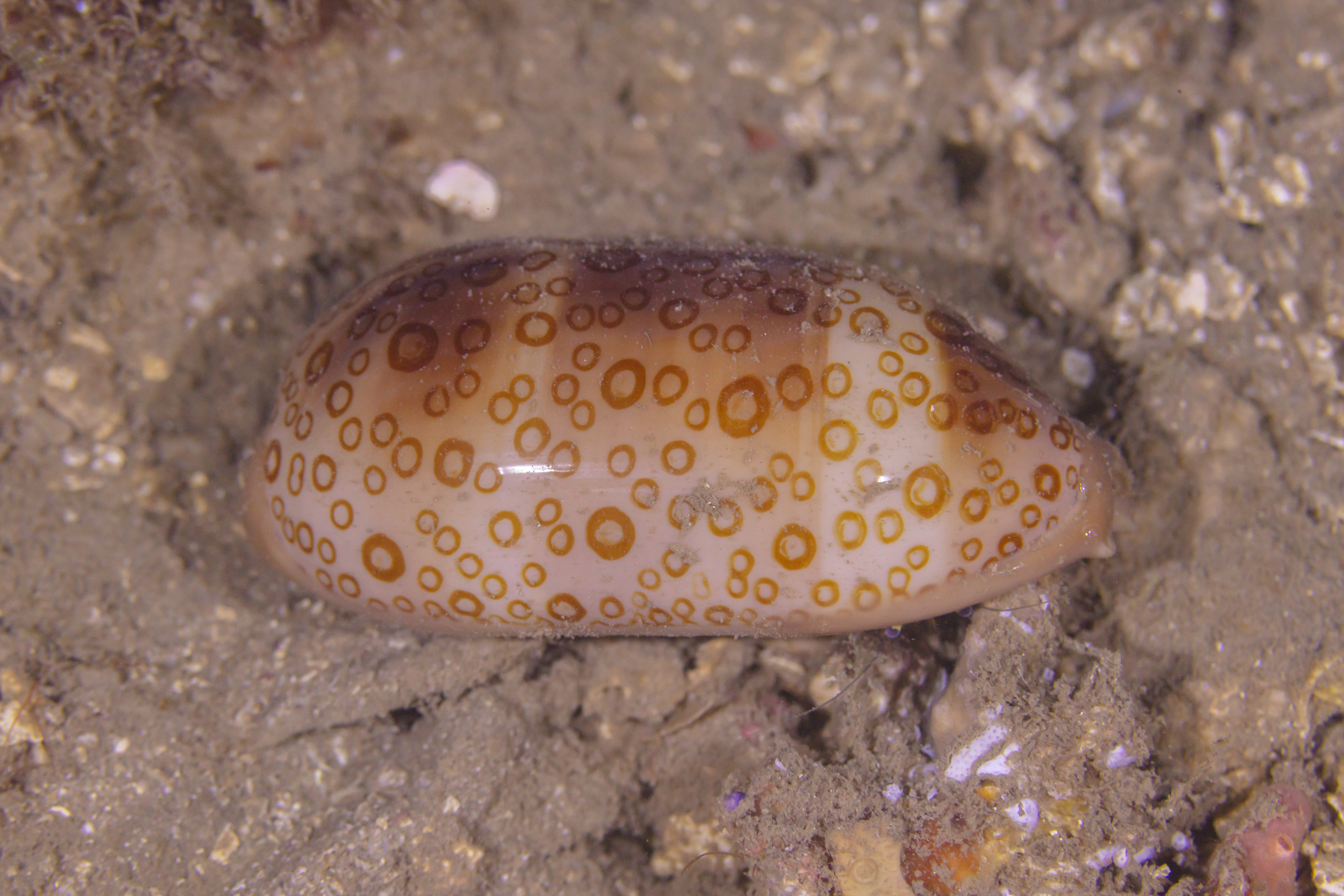
Arestorides argus in Nosy Be, Madagascar.

Arestorides argus, commonly called the eyed cowrie, is a species of sea snail, a cowry, a marine gastropod mollusk in the family Cypraeidae, the cowries.

== Subspecies ==
Two subspecies are recognized :

- Arestorides argus argus (Linnaeus, 1758)
- Arestorides argus contracasta Lorenz, 2012
- Arestorides argus contrastriata (Perry, 1811) : common name : pheasant cowrie: synonym of Cypraea contrastriata Perry, 1811

== Description ==
This is a large cowry species, with specimens averaging 80mm and measuring up to 115mm. The shape of the shell is approximately cylindrical. The ground color is light to medium tan. Overlying the ground color of the dorsum are many rings of a medium brown color and varying sizes. The rings are likened to eye spots, thus the common name eyed cowry and the specific epithet argus (after Argus Panoptes, the many-eyed Greek giant). Some individuals have numerous small rings, others have fewer, larger rings; the number and size of rings especially varies between subspecies. The aperture is relatively straight, has well-developed teeth, and is flanked by two dark-brown blotches on each side (the blotches on the outer lip are sometimes small and indistinct).

== Distribution ==
This species and its subspecies are distributed in the Indian and Pacific Oceans. Notably, it is found in the seas off Aldabra, Chagos, the Comores, Kenya, Madagascar, the Mascarene Basin, Mauritius, Mozambique, Réunion, the Seychelles, Somalia and Tanzania.
