= Callistocypraea nivosa =

Scientific classification
- Kingdom: Animalia
- Phylum: Mollusca
- Class: Gastropoda
- Subclass: Caenogastropoda
- Order: Littorinimorpha
- Family: Cypraeidae
- Genus: Callistocypraea
- Species: C. nivosa

Binomial name
- Callistocypraea nivosa (Broderip, 1827)

Synonyms
- Cypraea nivosa Broderip, 1827; Lyncina nivosa (Broderip, 1827)

Species of gastropod

Callistocypraea nivosa is a species of sea snail, a cowry, a marine gastropod mollusk in the family Cypraeidae, the cowries.

== Distribution ==
This species is distributed in the Gulf of Bengal along Myanmar and Thailand and in the Pacific Ocean along Sumatra.
