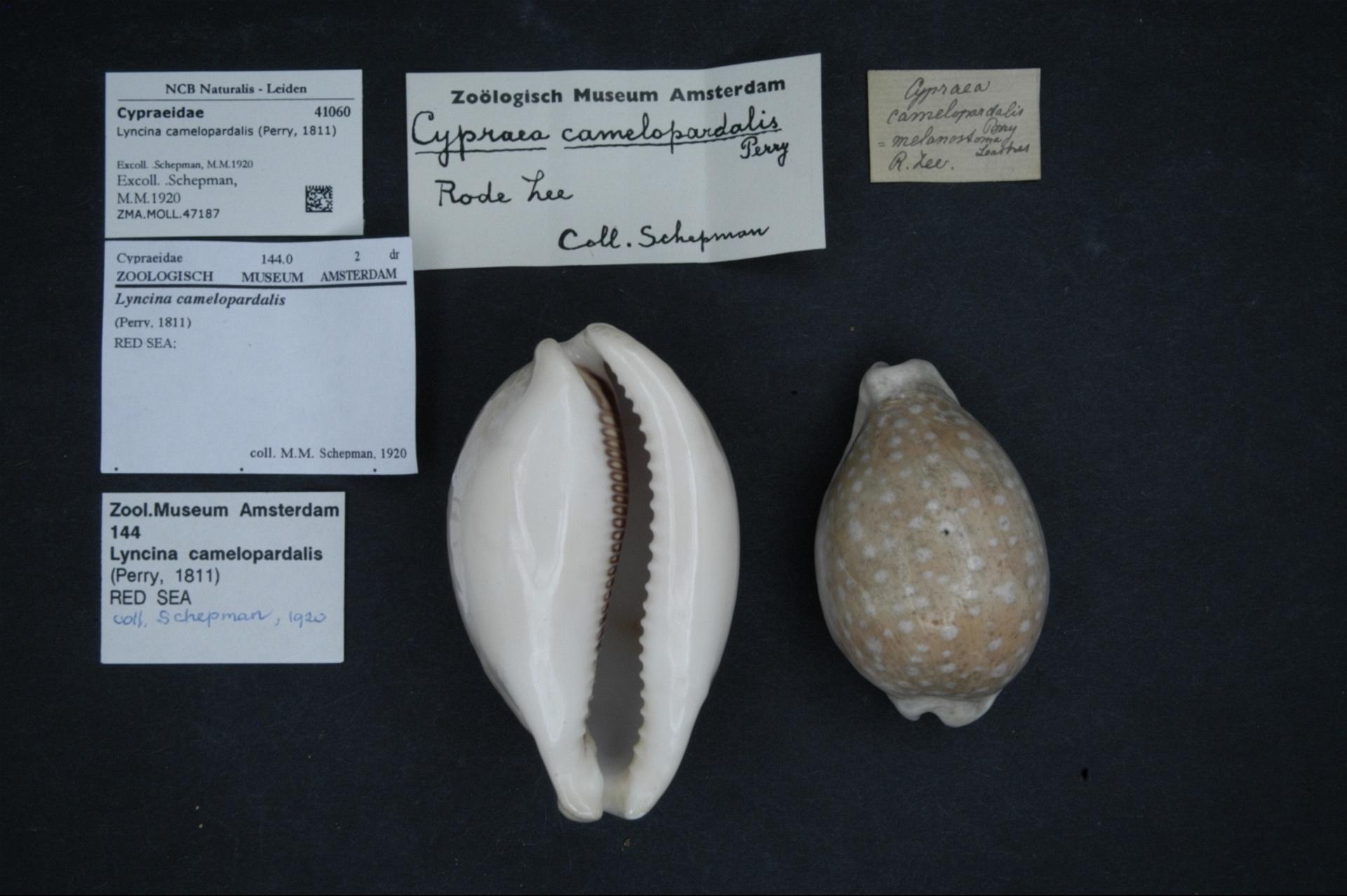

Scientific classification
- Kingdom: Animalia
- Phylum: Mollusca
- Class: Gastropoda
- Subclass: Caenogastropoda
- Order: Littorinimorpha
- Family: Cypraeidae
- Genus: Lyncina
- Species: L. camelopardalis

Binomial name
- Lyncina camelopardalis (Perry, 1811)

Synonyms
- Cypraea camelopardalis Perry, 1811 (basionym)

= Lyncina camelopardalis =

Species of gastropod

Lyncina camelopardalis, common name the camel cowrie, is a species of sea snail, a cowry, a marine gastropod mollusk in the family Cypraeidae, the cowries.

There is one subspecies : Lyncina camelopardalis sharmiensis Heiman & Mienis, 1999

== Distribution ==
This species is distributed in the Red Sea and in the Indian Ocean along Eritrea, Somalia and Madagascar.
