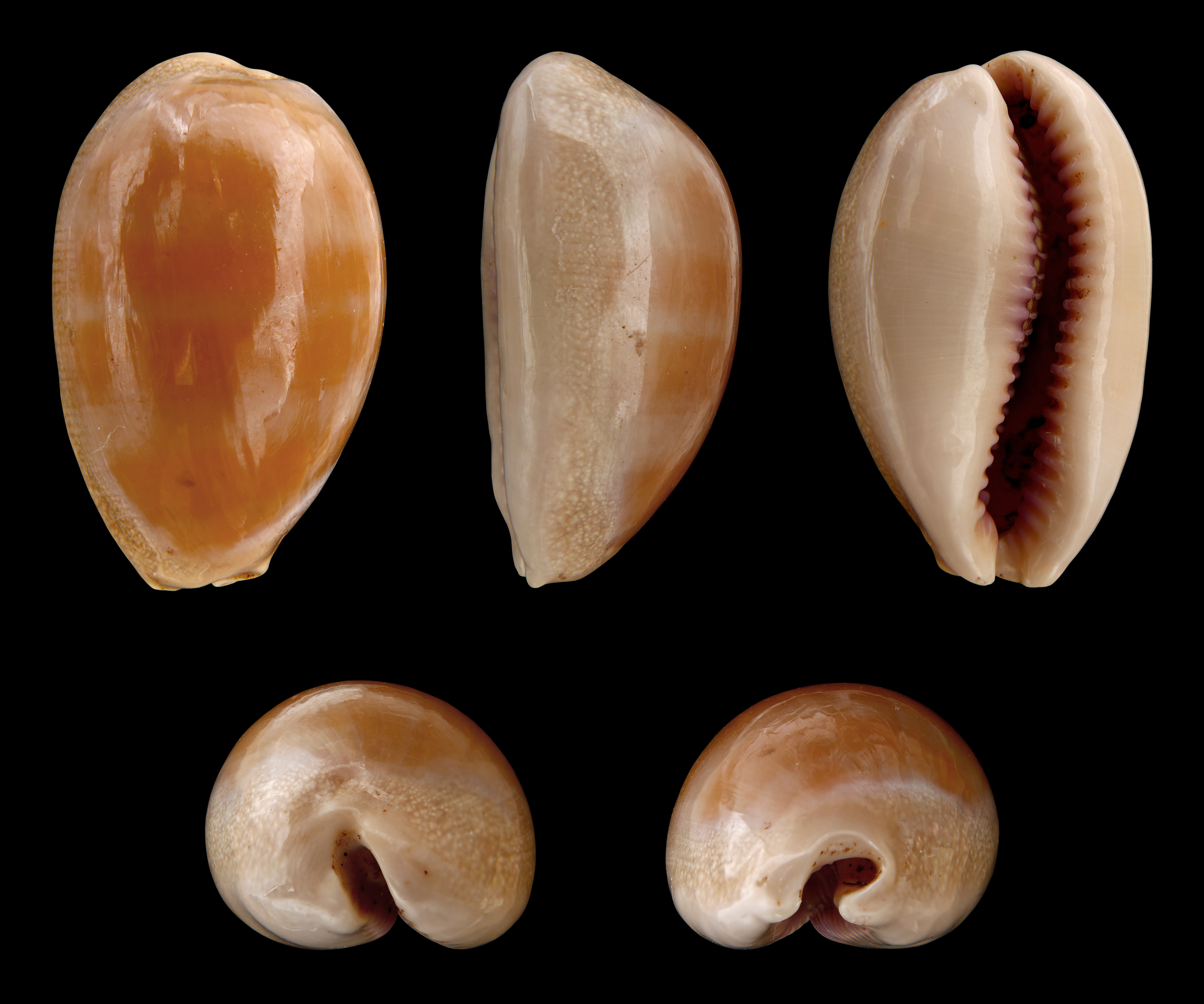
- Five views of a shell of Lyncina carneola

Scientific classification
- Kingdom: Animalia
- Phylum: Mollusca
- Class: Gastropoda
- Subclass: Caenogastropoda
- Order: Littorinimorpha
- Family: Cypraeidae
- Genus: Lyncina
- Species: L. carneola

Binomial name
- Lyncina carneola (Linnaeus, 1758)

Synonyms
- Cypraea propinqua Garrett, 1879; Cypraea carneola Linnaeus, 1758 (basionym)

= Lyncina carneola =

Species of gastropod

Lyncina carneola, common name the carnelian cowrie, is a species of sea snail, a cowry, a marine gastropod mollusk in the family Cypraeidae, the cowries.

== Description ==
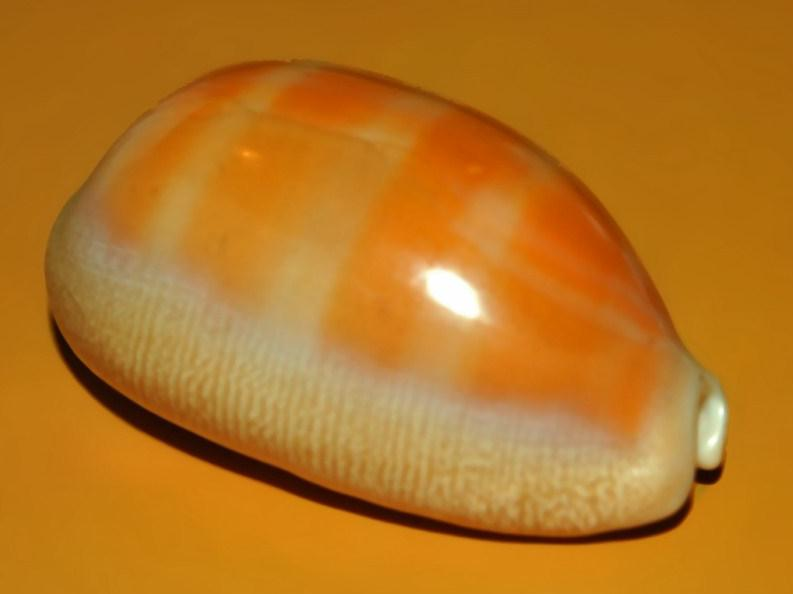
Lyncina carneola, side view

These cowries reach 30–80 millimetres (1.2–3.1 in) in length. Their shape is rounded and the basic color is a pale orange-brown, with some transverse bands.

== Distribution ==
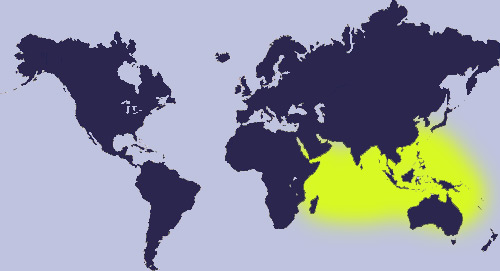
Distribution map of Lyncina carneola

This species occurs in the seas off Aldabra, Chagos, and the Comores, the East Coast of South Africa, Eritrea, Kenya, Madagascar, the Mascarene Basin, Mauritius, Mozambique, the Red Sea, Réunion, the Seychelles, Somalia and Tanzania.
