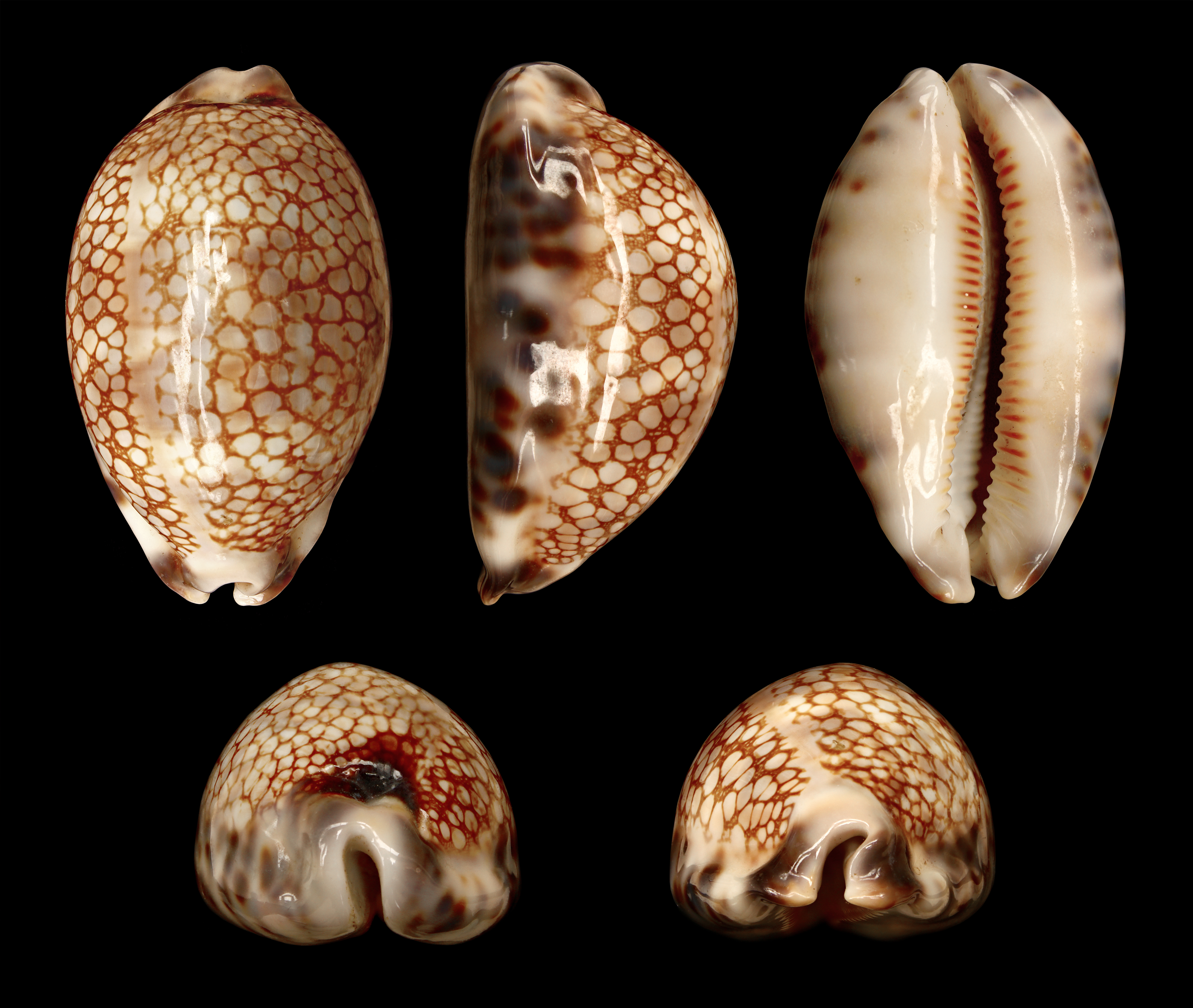
- Five views of a shell of Mauritia histrio

Scientific classification
- Kingdom: Animalia
- Phylum: Mollusca
- Class: Gastropoda
- Subclass: Caenogastropoda
- Order: Littorinimorpha
- Family: Cypraeidae
- Genus: Mauritia
- Species: M. histrio

Binomial name
- Mauritia histrio (Gmelin, 1791)

= Mauritia histrio =

Species of gastropod

Mauritia histrio, common name the harlequin cowry or the stage cowry, is a species of sea snail, a cowry, a marine gastropod mollusk in the family Cypraeidae, the cowries.

== Description ==
These quite common large shell reach on average 40–55 millimetres (1.6–2.2 in) of length, with a maximum size of 88 millimetres (3.5 in) and a minimum adult size of 20 millimetres (0.79 in). The basic color of the shell is pale brown, with many grey round spots on the dorsum surface and several dark brown marginal spots on the edges. The base is mainly white or pale brown, with a wide aperture and well-developed darker teeth, longer and stronger on the outer side. In the living mollusk the mantle is transparent, with short papillae. Mauritia histrio is quite similar to Cypraea arabica and Mauritia eglantina.

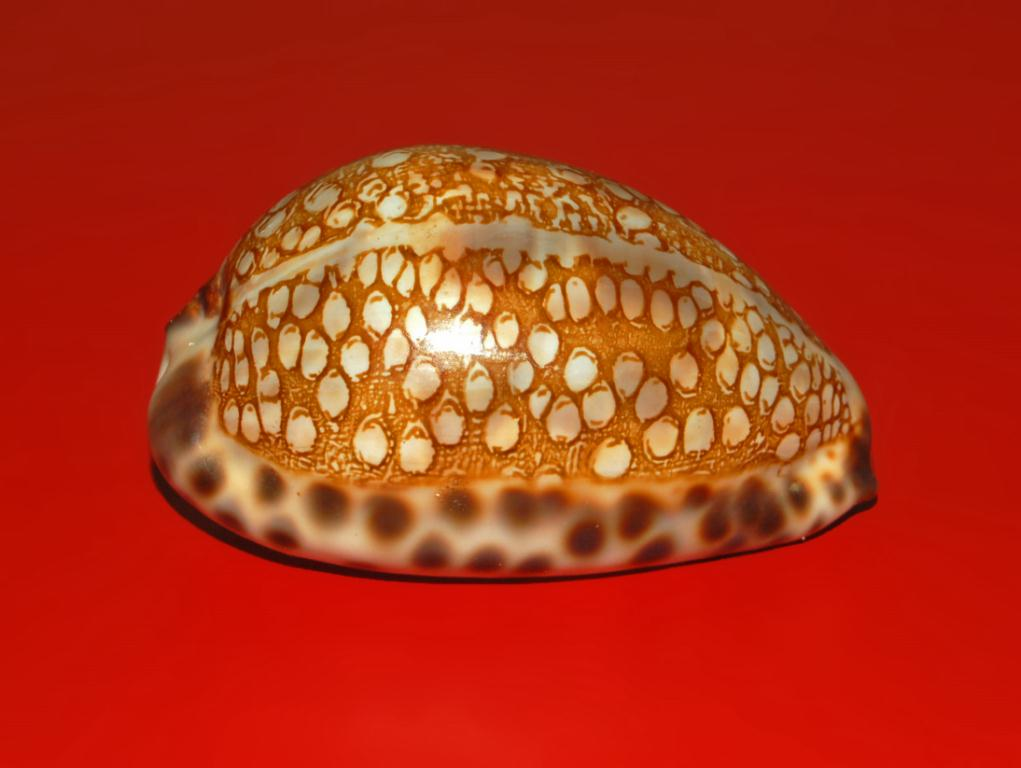
A lateral view of a shell of Mauritia histrio from Philippines, anterior end towards the right

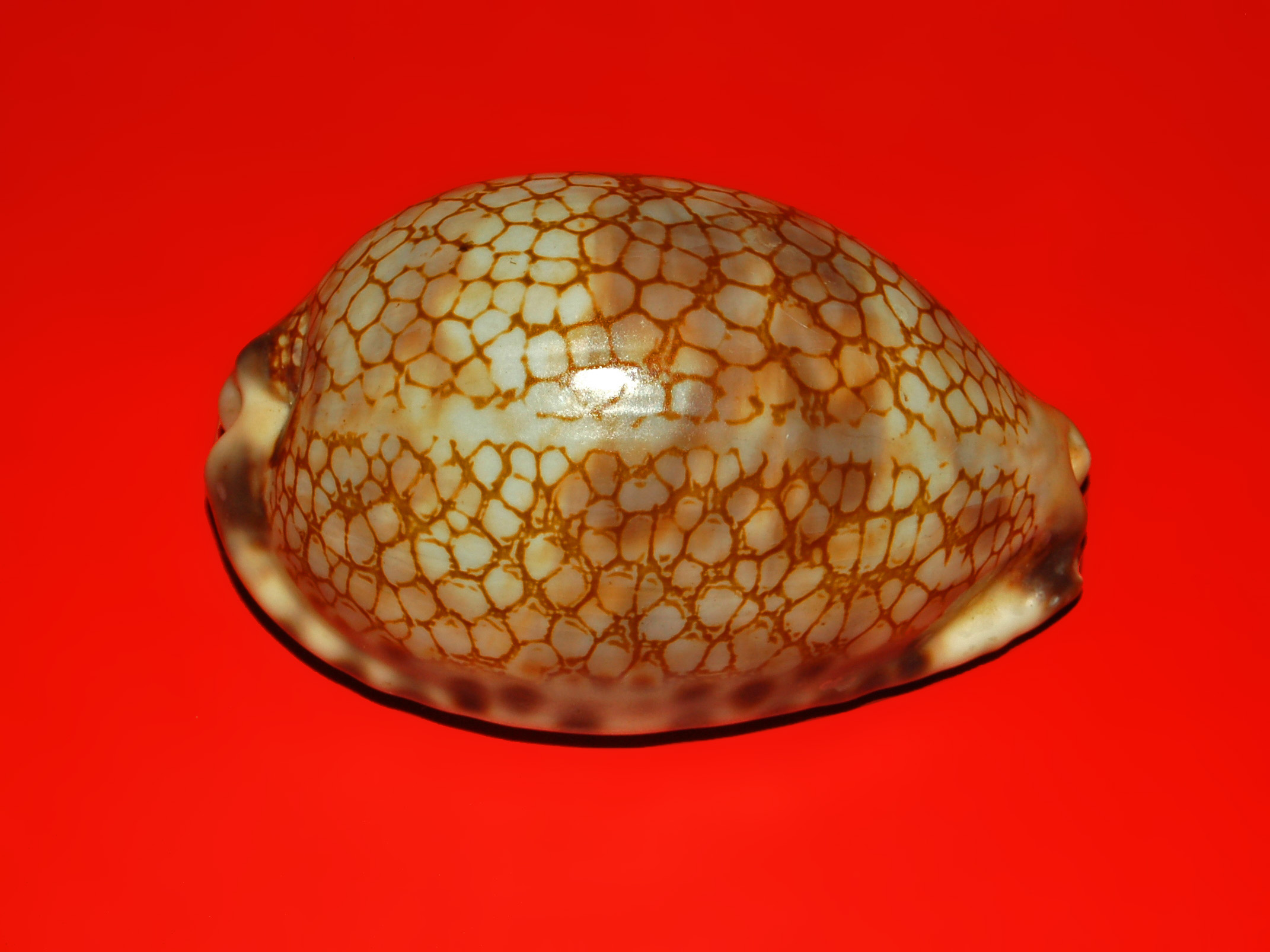
Mauritia histrio from the Philippines, dorsal view

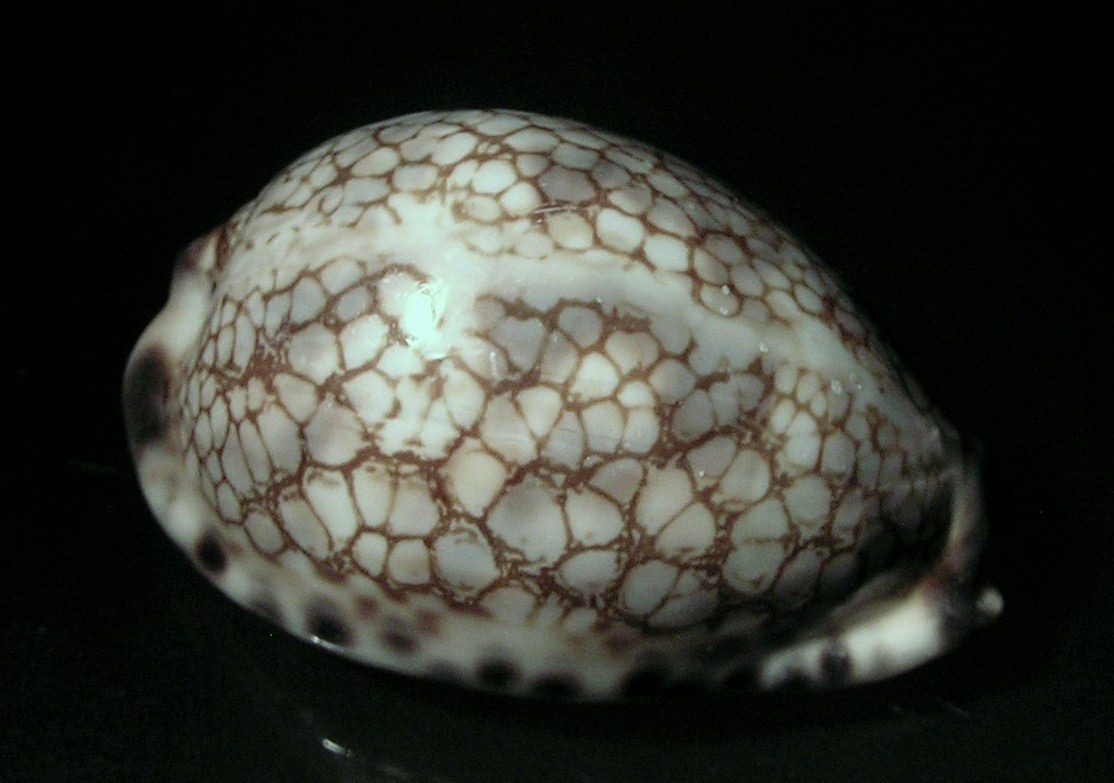
A dorsal view of Mauritia histrio westralis

== Distribution ==
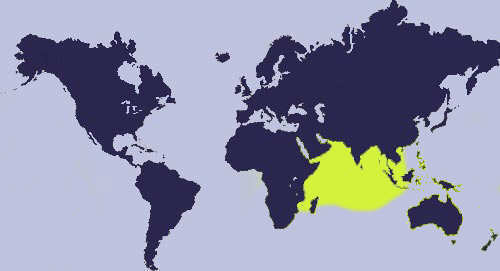
Distribution map of Mauritia histrio

This species is distributed in the Indian Ocean and Western Pacific Ocean, along Aldabra, Chagos, East Africa, Kenya, Madagascar, the Mascarene Basin, Mauritius, Mozambique, Réunion, the Seychelles, Tanzania, North West Australia and Philippines.

== Habitat ==
Mauritia histrio lives in tropical shallow water. It is nocturnal, hiding during the day under rocks, large blocks or in deep crevices in coral reefs.

== Synonyms ==
- Cypraea histrio Gmelin, 1791 (basionym)
- Cypraea reticulata Martyn, 1784
- Cypraea amethystea Linnaeus, 1758
- Cypraea histrio Gmelin, 1791
- Cypraea oculata Röding, 1798
- Cypraea undosa Röding, 1798
- Cypraea arlequina Mörch, 1852
- Arabica westralis Iredale, 1935
- Mauritia (Arabica) histrio var. duploreticulata Coen, 1949

== Subspecies ==
- Mauritia histrio histrio Gmelin, 1791
- Mauritia histrio westralis Iredale, 1935
