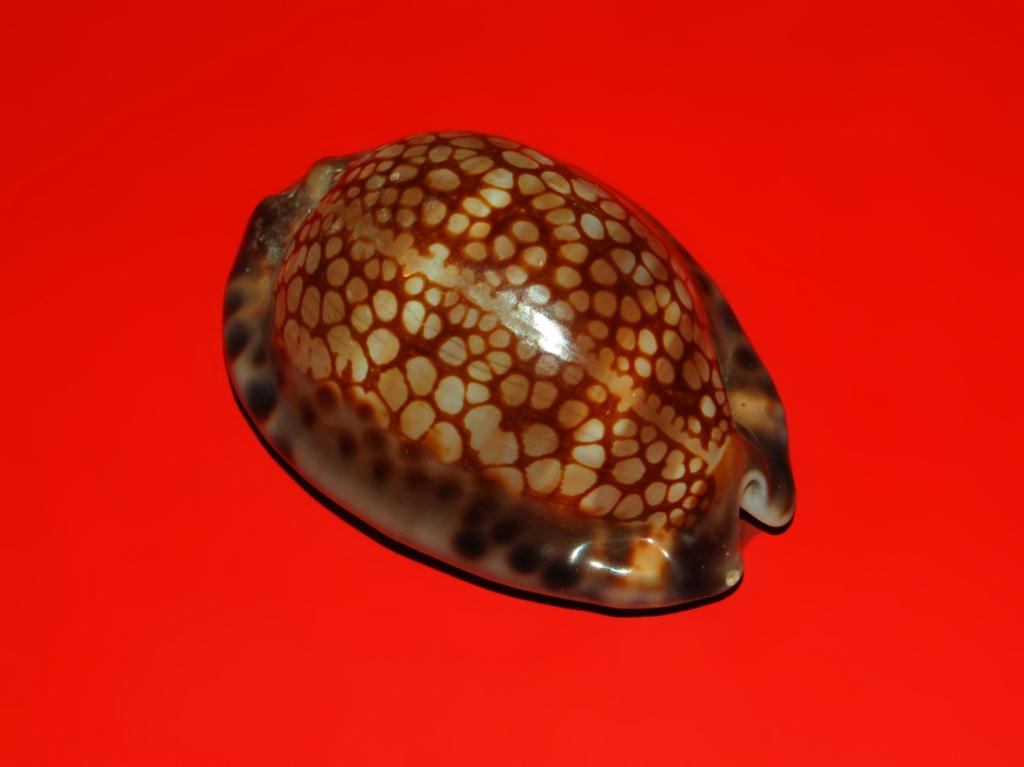
- A shell of Mauritia maculifera from Hawaii, anterior end towards the right

Scientific classification
- Kingdom: Animalia
- Phylum: Mollusca
- Class: Gastropoda
- Subclass: Caenogastropoda
- Order: Littorinimorpha
- Family: Cypraeidae
- Genus: Mauritia
- Species: M. maculifera

Binomial name
- Mauritia maculifera Schilder, 1932

Synonyms
- Cypraea maculifera (Schilder, 1932)

= Mauritia maculifera =

Species of gastropod

Mauritia maculifera, common name : the blotched cowry or reticulated cowry, is a species of sea snail, a cowry, a marine gastropod mollusk in the family Cypraeidae, the cowries.

== Description ==
The shells of these cowries reach on average 44–54 millimetres (1.7–2.1 in) in length, with a minimum size of 30 millimetres (1.2 in) and a maximum size of 89 millimetres (3.5 in). The dorsum surface of these smooth and shiny shells is generally dark brown, with distinct large bluish dots. On the edges there are large brown spots. The base is white or pale brown or pale pinkish. The aperture is long and narrow, with several dark brown teeth. This species can be distinguished by a characteristic brown columellar spot. In the living cowries the mantle is transparent, with blue sensorial papillae and may cover the entire shell.

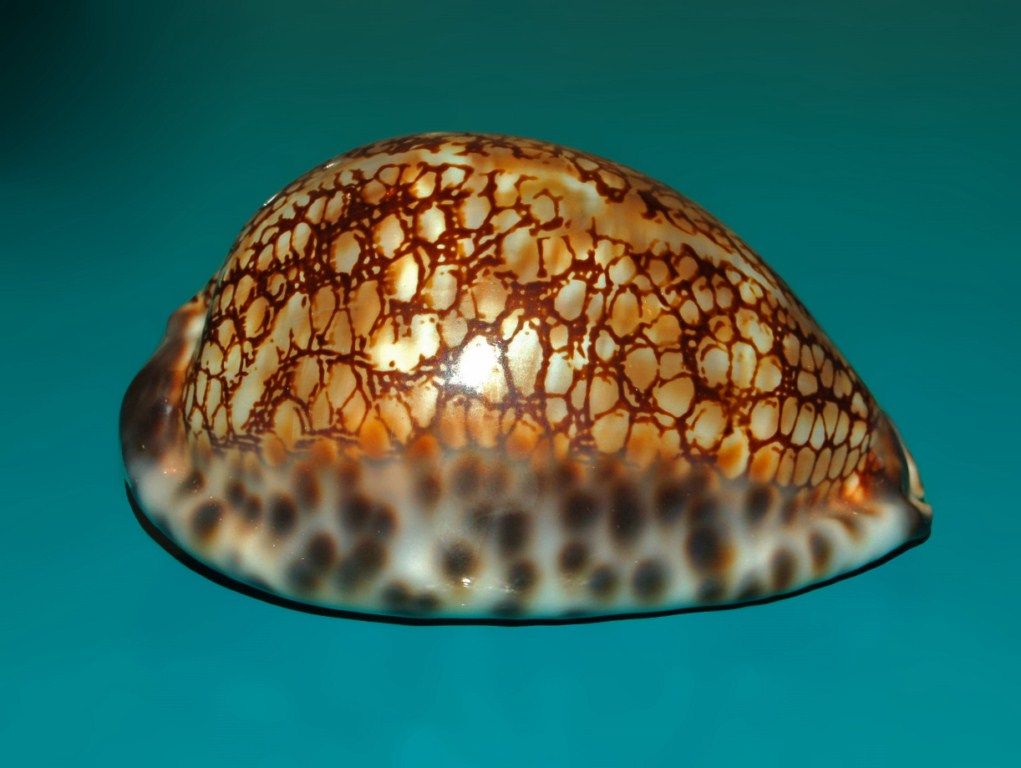
A shell of Mauritia maculifera from Rangiroa, Polynesia, lateral view, anterior end towards the right

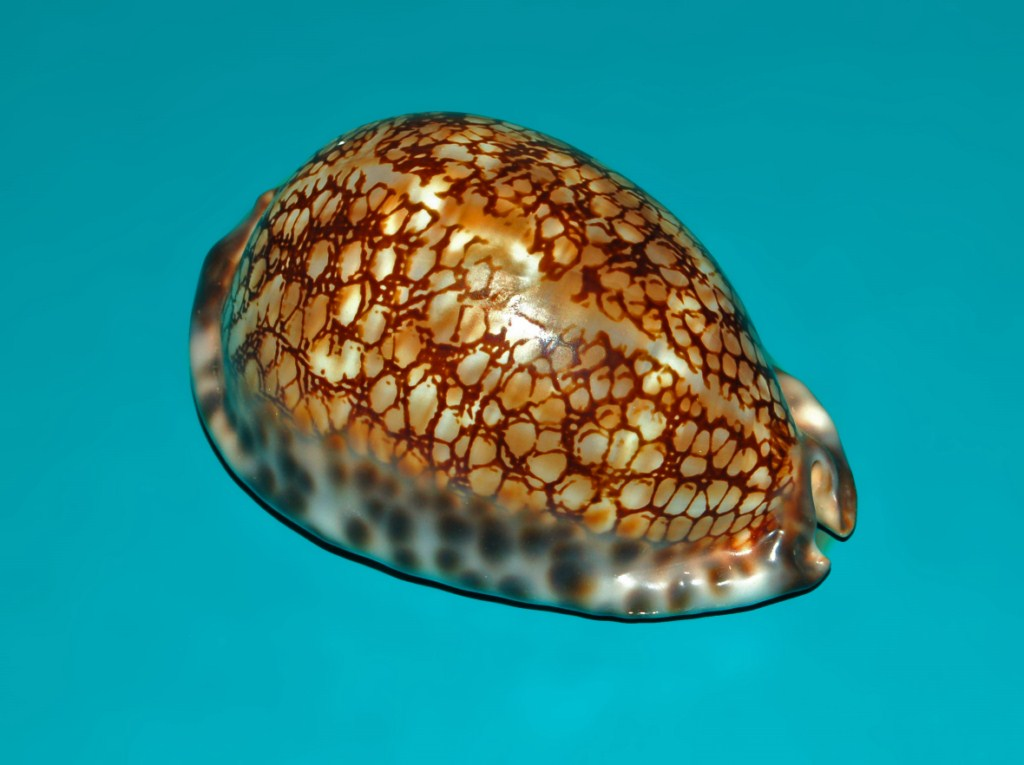
Dorsal view of shells of Mauritia maculifera from Rangiroa, Polynesia, anterior end towards the right

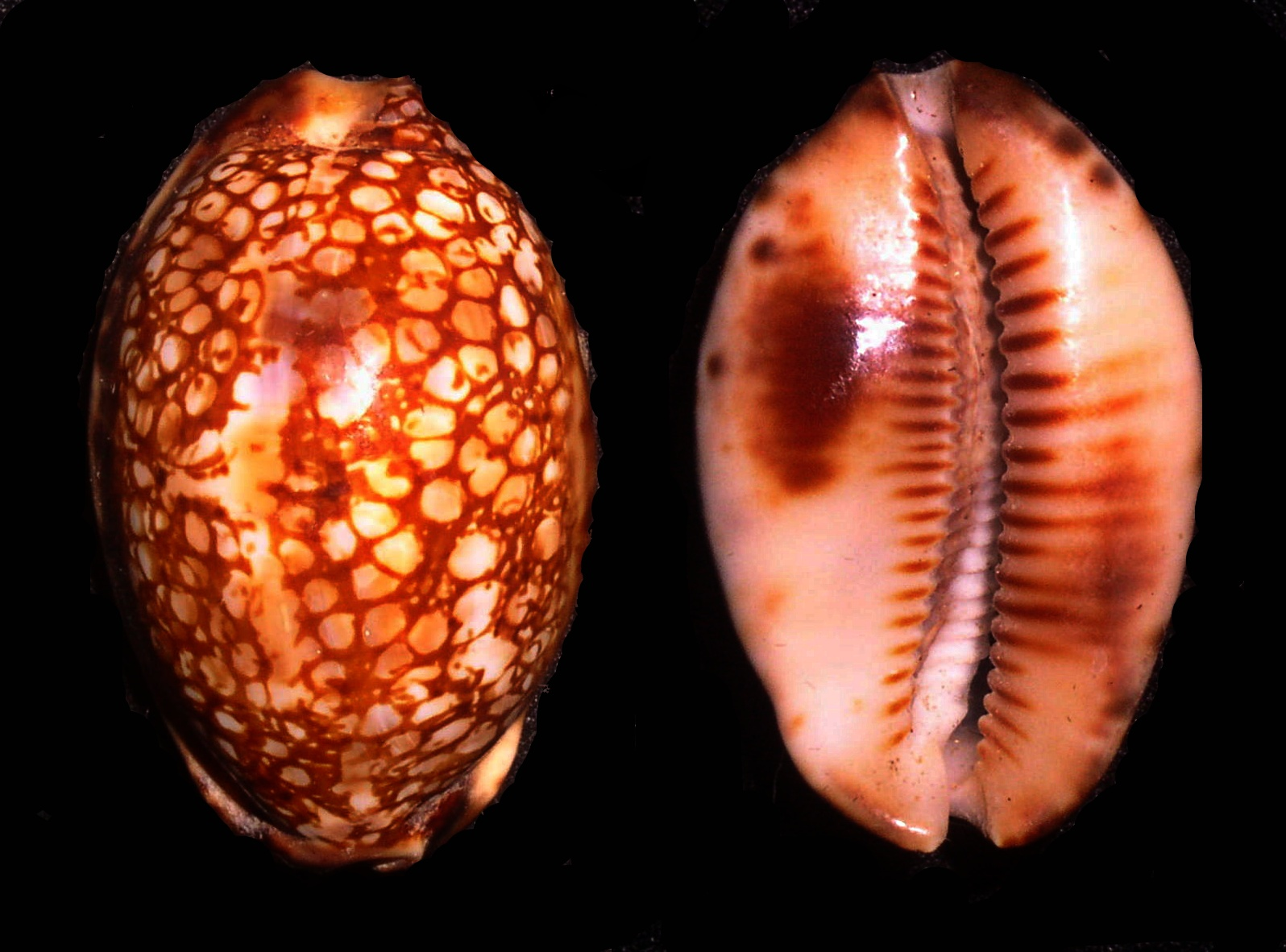
Dorsal and apertural view of shells of Mauritia maculifera

== Distribution ==
This quite common species occurs in the Indian Ocean along Chagos and the Seychelles and in the Pacific Ocean (from South-East Asia, Philippines, Fiji and Micronesia through western Polynesia and Hawaii).

== Habitat ==
This species lives in tropical shallow water, subtidal and low intertidal, usually under rocks or coral reefs at a minimum depth of about 4 metres (13 ft). As they fear the light, they start feeding at dusk mainly on sponges or coral polyps.

== Subspecies ==
Four subspecies have been recognized :

- Mauritia maculifera andreae Erdmann & Lorenz, 2017
- Mauritia maculifera maculifera Schilder, 1932
- Mauritia maculifera martybealsi Lorenz, 2002
- Mauritia maculifera scindata Lorenz, 2002
- Mauritia maculifera hawaiiensis Heiman, 2005: synonym of Mauritia maculifera maculifera Schilder, 1932
