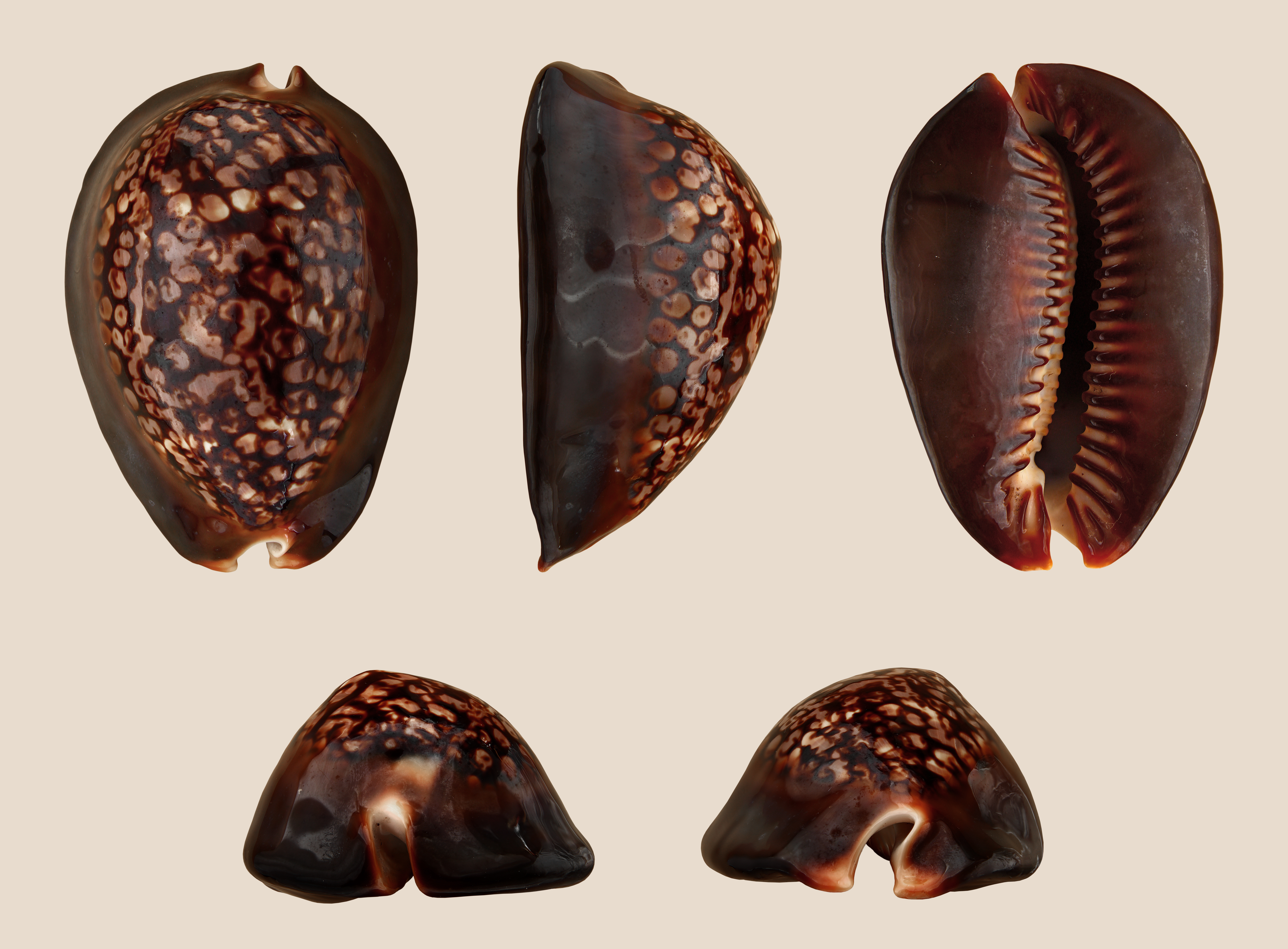
- Five views of a shell of Mauritia mauritiana

Scientific classification
- Kingdom: Animalia
- Phylum: Mollusca
- Class: Gastropoda
- Subclass: Caenogastropoda
- Order: Littorinimorpha
- Family: Cypraeidae
- Genus: Mauritia
- Species: M. mauritiana

Binomial name
- Mauritia mauritiana (Linnaeus, 1758)

Synonyms
- Cypraea mauritiana Linnaeus, 1758 (basionym)

= Mauritia mauritiana =

Species of gastropod

Mauritia mauritiana, common names the humpback cowry, chocolate cowry, mourning cowry and Mauritius cowry, is a species of tropical sea snail, a cowry, a marine gastropod mollusc in the family Cypraeidae, the cowries.

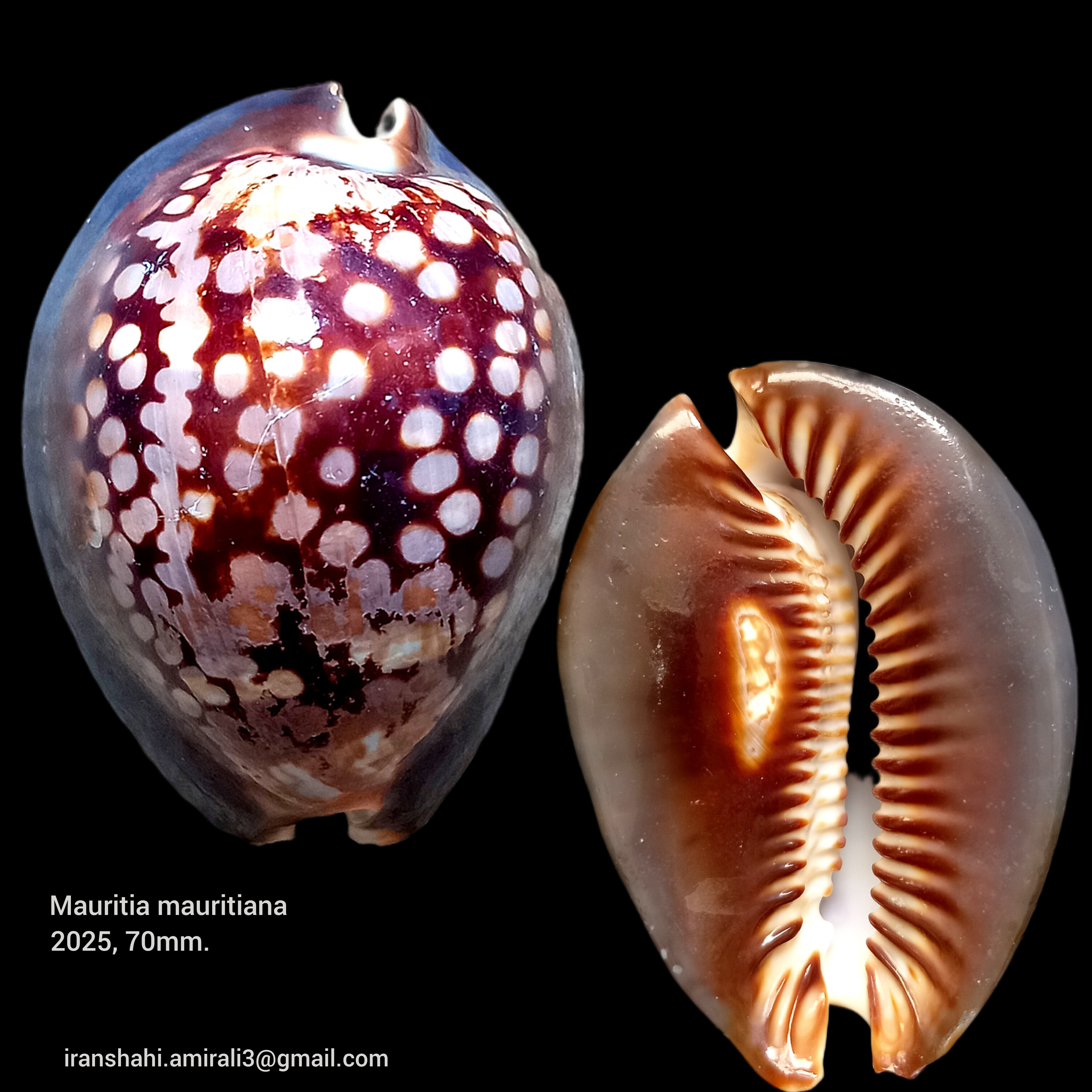
Mauritia mauritiana

== Description ==
The shells of these quite common cowries reach on average 65–80 millimetres (2.6–3.1 in) in length, with a minimum size of 43 millimetres (1.7 in) and a maximum size of 130 millimetres (5.1 in). The dorsum surface of these smooth and shiny shells is generally dark brown, with distinct large yellowish or amber dots. The edges of the dorsum and the base are completely dark brown. The aperture is long and narrow, with several dark brown teeth and clear spacing. In the living cowries the mantle is completely black, without sensorial papillae.

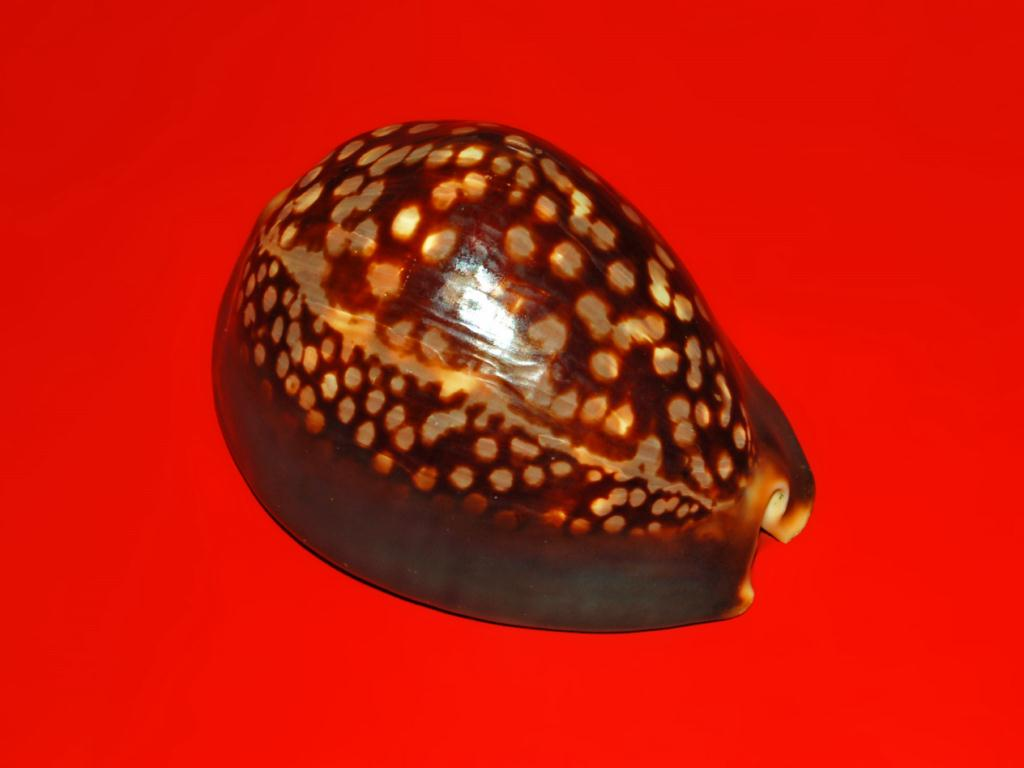
Shell of Mauritia mauritiana from Hawaii

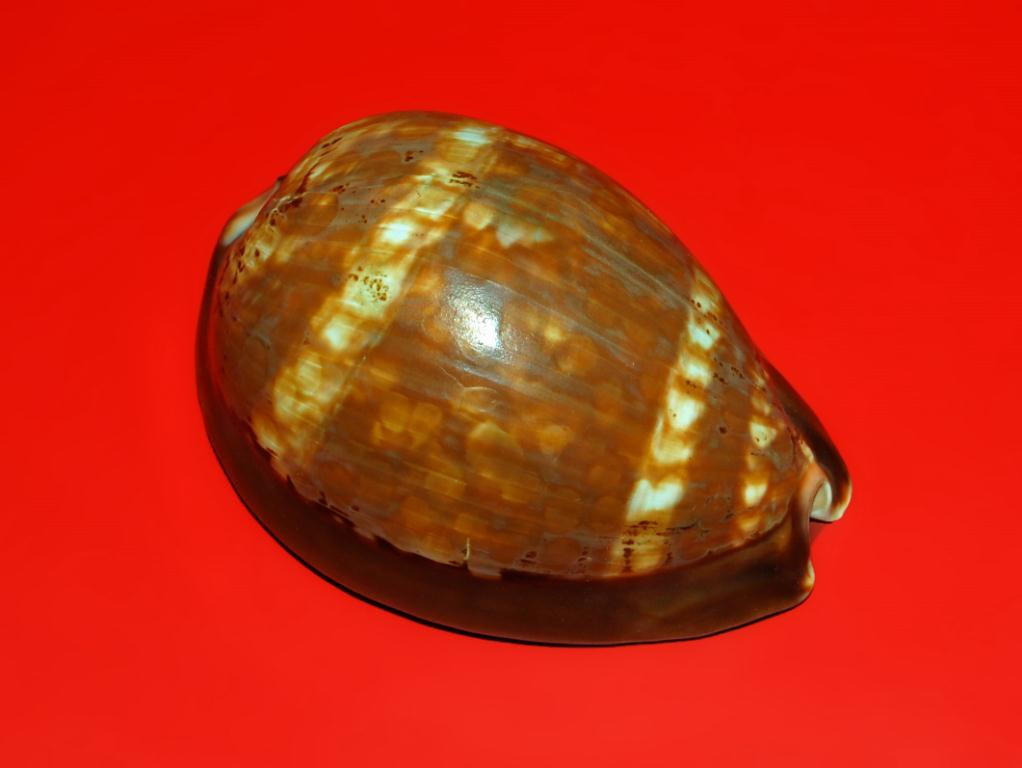
Subadult Mauritia mauritiana from Hawaii

== Distribution ==
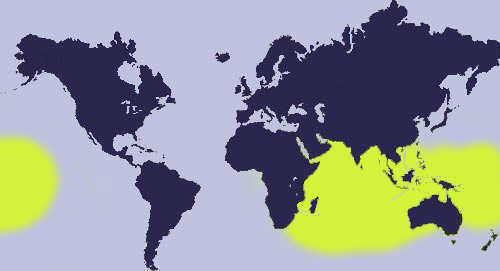
Range

This is an Indo-Pacific species (see range map) occurring in the Indian Ocean along South-East Africa and in the western Pacific Ocean (western and northern Australia, Malaysia, Philippines and Hawaii).

== Habitat ==
This species of cowry is normally restricted to exposed habitats such as wave-washed basalt cliffs or breakwaters. Mauritia mauritiana lives in tropical low intertidal water, usually under rocks or in rocky crevices at a minimum depth of about 2 metres (6 ft 7 in), but can be found up to 50 metres (160 ft).
