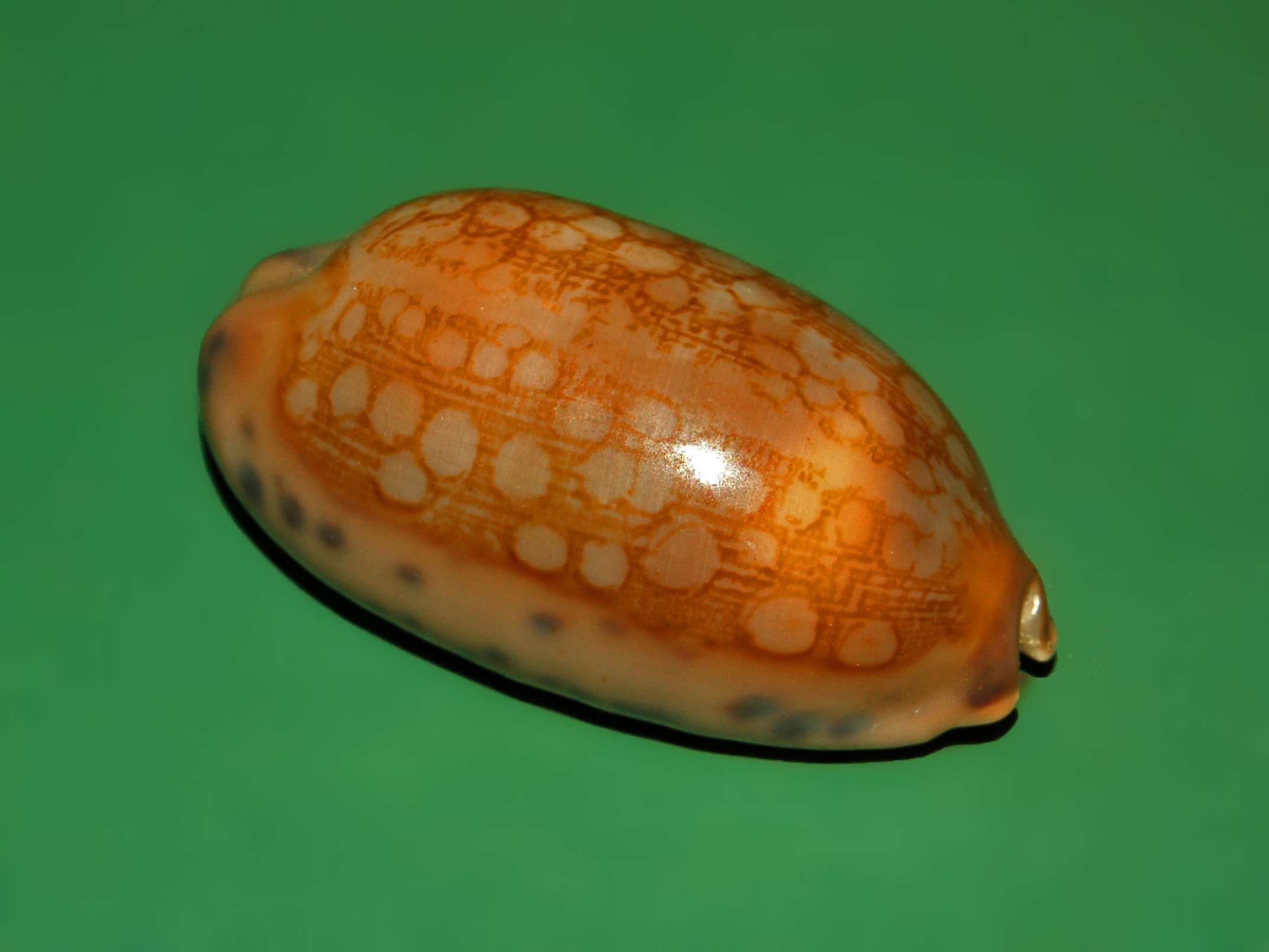
- A shell of Mauritia scurra from Philippines, anterior end towards the right

Scientific classification
- Kingdom: Animalia
- Phylum: Mollusca
- Class: Gastropoda
- Subclass: Caenogastropoda
- Order: Littorinimorpha
- Family: Cypraeidae
- Genus: Mauritia
- Species: M. scurra

Binomial name
- Mauritia scurra (Gmelin, 1791)

Synonyms
- Cypraea amarata (Meuschen, 1787); Cypraea scurra Gmelin, 1791 (basionym)

= Mauritia scurra =

Species of gastropod

Mauritia scurra, common name the jester cowry, is a species of sea snail, a cowry, a marine gastropod mollusk in the family Cypraeidae, the cowries.

Subspecies

- Mauritia scurra occidua C. P. Meyer & Lorenz, 2017
- Mauritia scurra scurra (Gmelin, 1791)
- Mauritia scurra indica (Gmelin, 1791): synonym of Mauritia scurra scurra (Gmelin, 1791)
- Mauritia scurra mundula Lorenz, 2002: synonym of Mauritia scurra scurra (Gmelin, 1791)

== Description ==
The shells of these quite uncommon cowries reach on average 38–43 millimetres (1.5–1.7 in) of length, with a minimum size of 23 millimetres (0.91 in) and a maximum size of 57 millimetres (2.2 in). The shape is slender and slightly cylindrical, the dorsum surface is reticulate, smooth and shiny, the basic color is light brown, with beige round spots. Margins are beige too, wide and rounded, with dark brown spots. The base may be whitish, pinkish or purplish, usually with long fine dark brown teeth along a narrow aperture. In the living cowries mantle is dark grey, with clearer sensorial papillae.

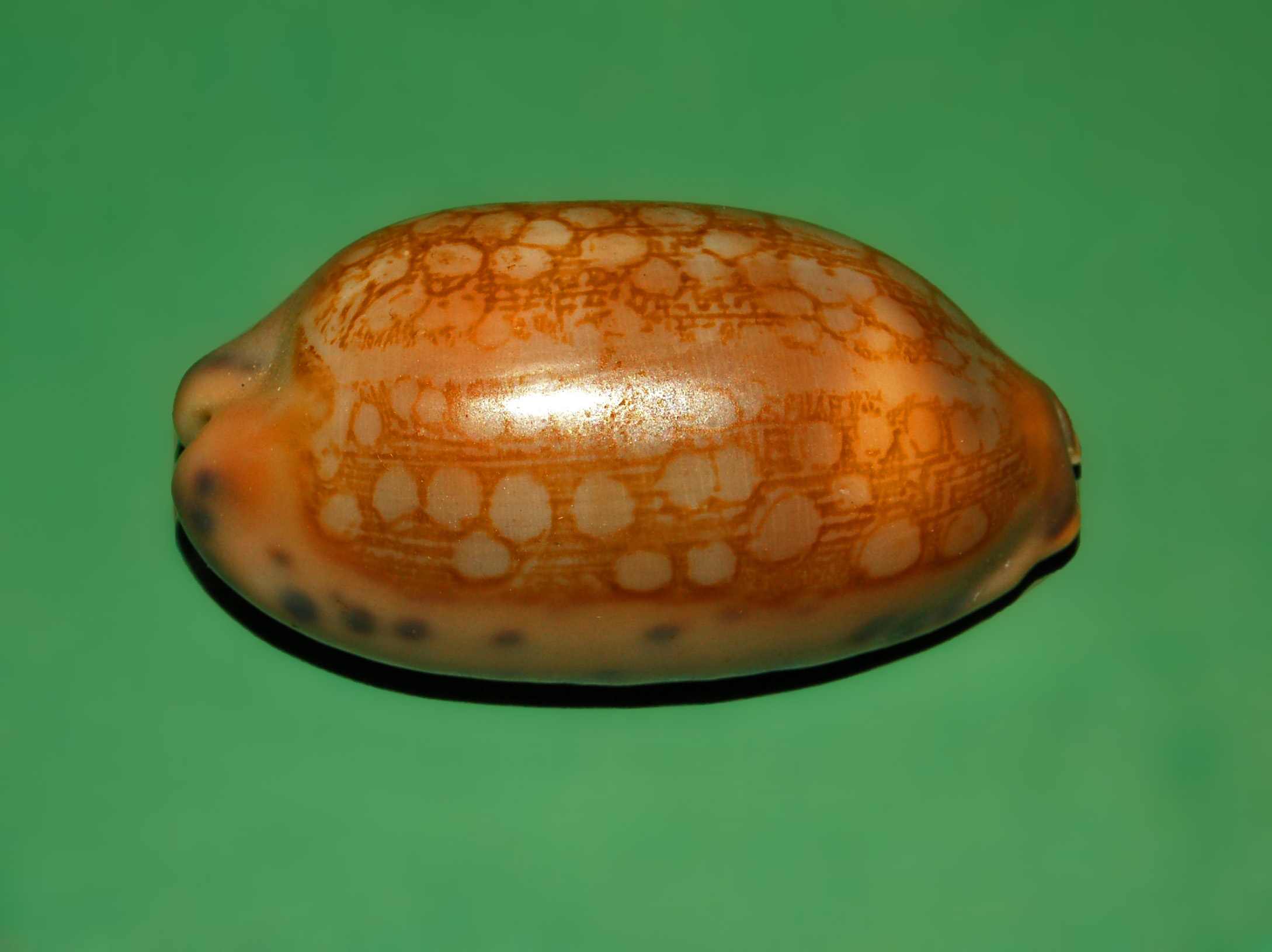
A shell of Mauritia scurra from Philippines, dorsal view, anterior end towards the right

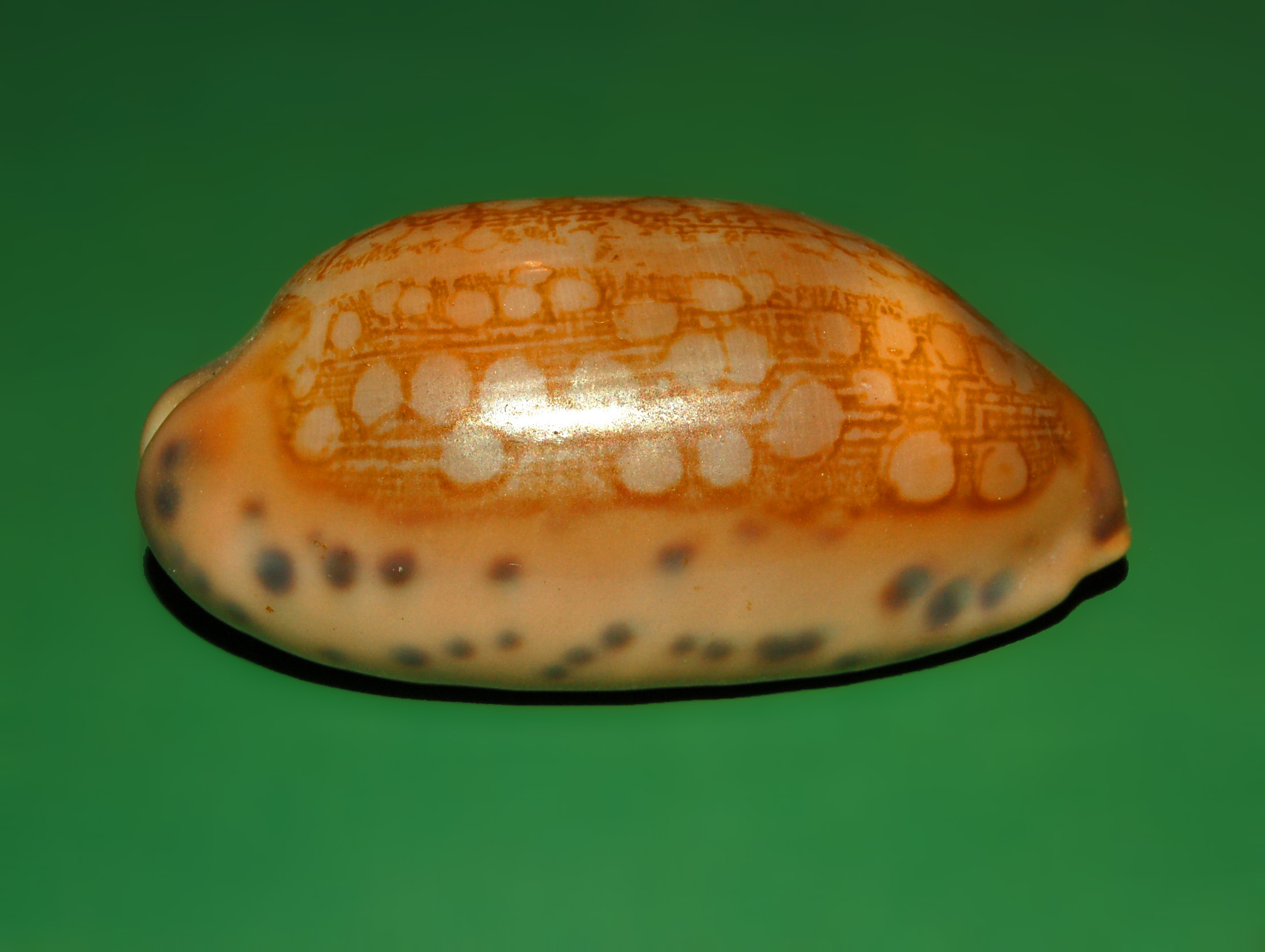
A shell of Mauritia scurra from Philippines, lateral view, anterior end towards the right

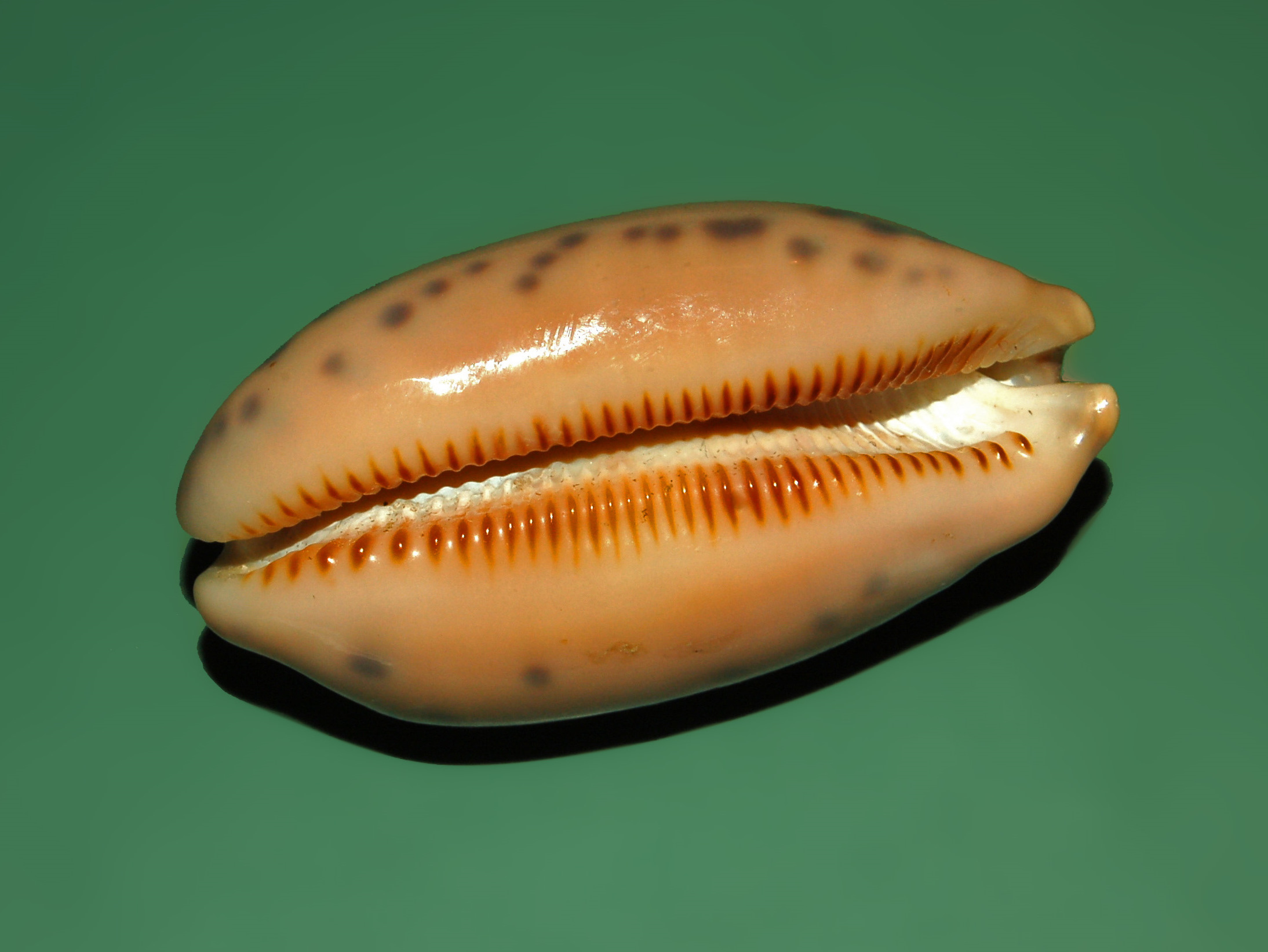
A shell of Mauritia scurra from Philippines, apertural view, anterior end towards the right

== Distribution ==
This species and subspecies range across the Central and East Indian Ocean along East Africa (Red Sea, Somalia, Aldabra, Chagos, the Comores, Kenya, Tanzania, Zanzibar, Madagascar, the Mascarene Basin, Mauritius, Mozambique, Réunion, the Seychelles) and in the West Pacific Ocean (Malaysia, Sulu Sea, Eastern Australia, Philippines, Samar Island, French Polynesia, Oceania, Hawaii).

== Habitat ==
These cowries mainly live on coral reef in tropical subtidal and intertidal waters and in the continental shelf, usually hidden under rocks, coral slabs or small caves during the day, as they start feeding at dusk.
