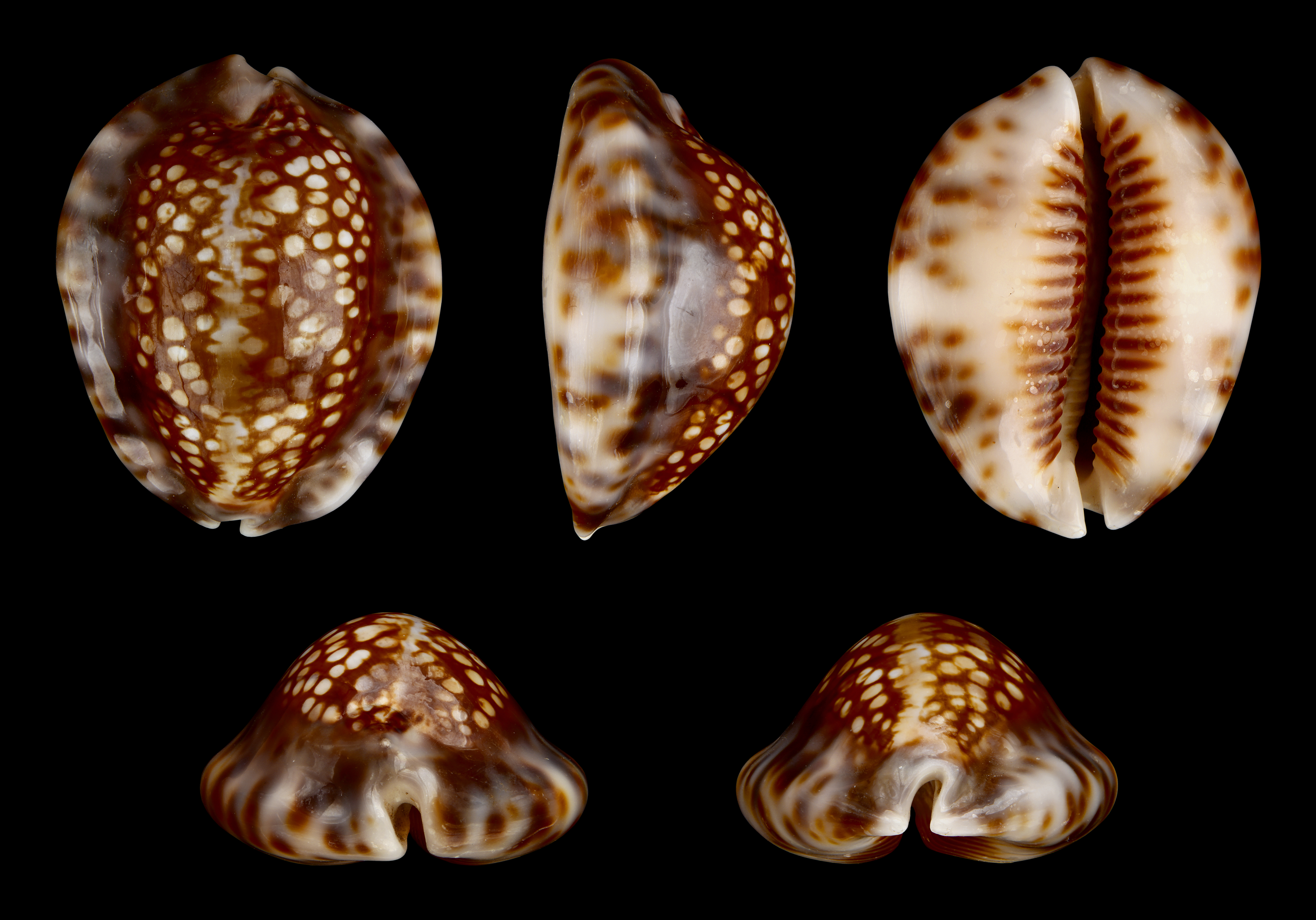
- Five views of a shell of Mauritia depressa

Scientific classification
- Kingdom: Animalia
- Phylum: Mollusca
- Class: Gastropoda
- Subclass: Caenogastropoda
- Order: Littorinimorpha
- Family: Cypraeidae
- Genus: Mauritia
- Species: M. depressa

Binomial name
- Mauritia depressa (Gray, 1824)

Synonyms
- Cypraea depressa Gray, 1824

= Mauritia depressa =

Species of gastropod

Mauritia depressa, common name the "depressed cowry" or the "honey cowry", is a species of sea snail, a cowry, a marine gastropod mollusk in the family Cypraeidae, the cowries.

== Description ==
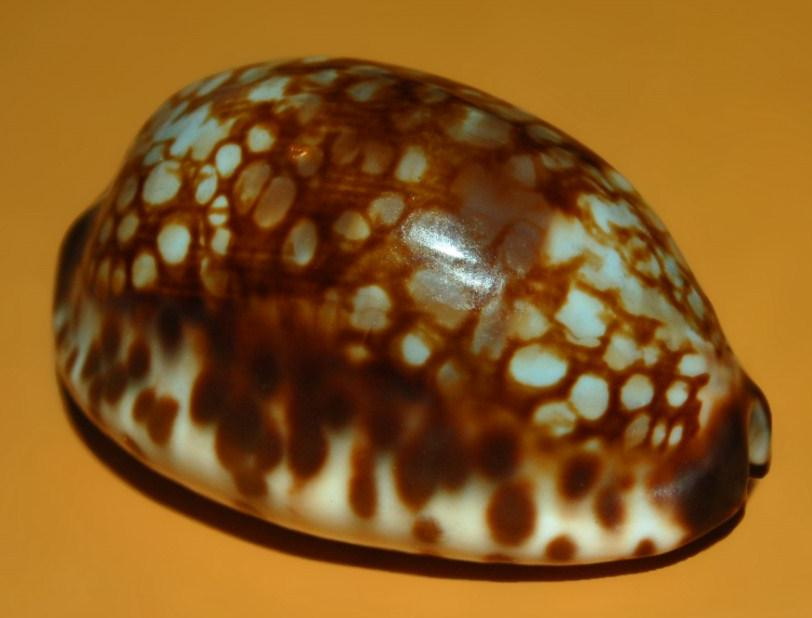
Shell of Mauritia depressa from Laccadives, anterior end towards the right

These quite rare shells reach on average 35–42 millimetres (1.4–1.7 in) of length, with a maximum size of 61 millimetres (2.4 in) and a minimum size of 23 millimetres (0.91 in). The dorsal color pattern varies from yellowish brown to dark brown, with distinct, almost circular, clear spots. The edges usually are pale bluish or yellowish, with several brown dots. The base is definitely flattened, its colour may be white, pale brown or pale bluish. The teeth along the aperture are dark brown on both lips.

== Distribution ==
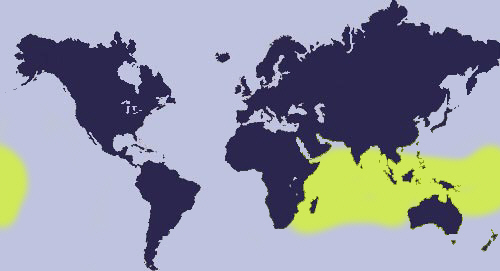
Distribution map of Mauritia depressa

This species occurs in the Central Pacific Ocean and in the Indian Ocean along Chagos, the Comores, Kenya, Madagascar, the Mascarene Basin, Mauritius, Réunion, Tanzania, Lakkadiven Islands, Timor, Philippines and French Polynesia.

== Habitat ==
These cowries mainly live in shallow water, in coral reefs or in lagoons near the wave-swept edges, from the intertidal zone to 20 metres (66 ft) depth, usually under coral slabs or rocks. They are active at night, when they feed on algal crests.

== Subspecies ==
- Mauritia depressa dispersa Schilder & Schilder, 1939

== Footnotes ==
- Verdcourt, B. (1954). The cowries of the East African Coast (Kenya, Tanganyika, Zanzibar and Pemba). Journal of the East Africa Natural History Society 22(4) 96: 129-144, 17 pls.
- Poutiers, J.M. 1998 - Gastropods. p. 363 – 648.
- Carpenter, K. E. and V. H. Niem. 1998. FAO species identification guide for fishery purposes. The living marine resources of the Western Central Pacific. Volume 1. Seaweeds, corals, bivalves, and gastropods. Rome, FAO.
