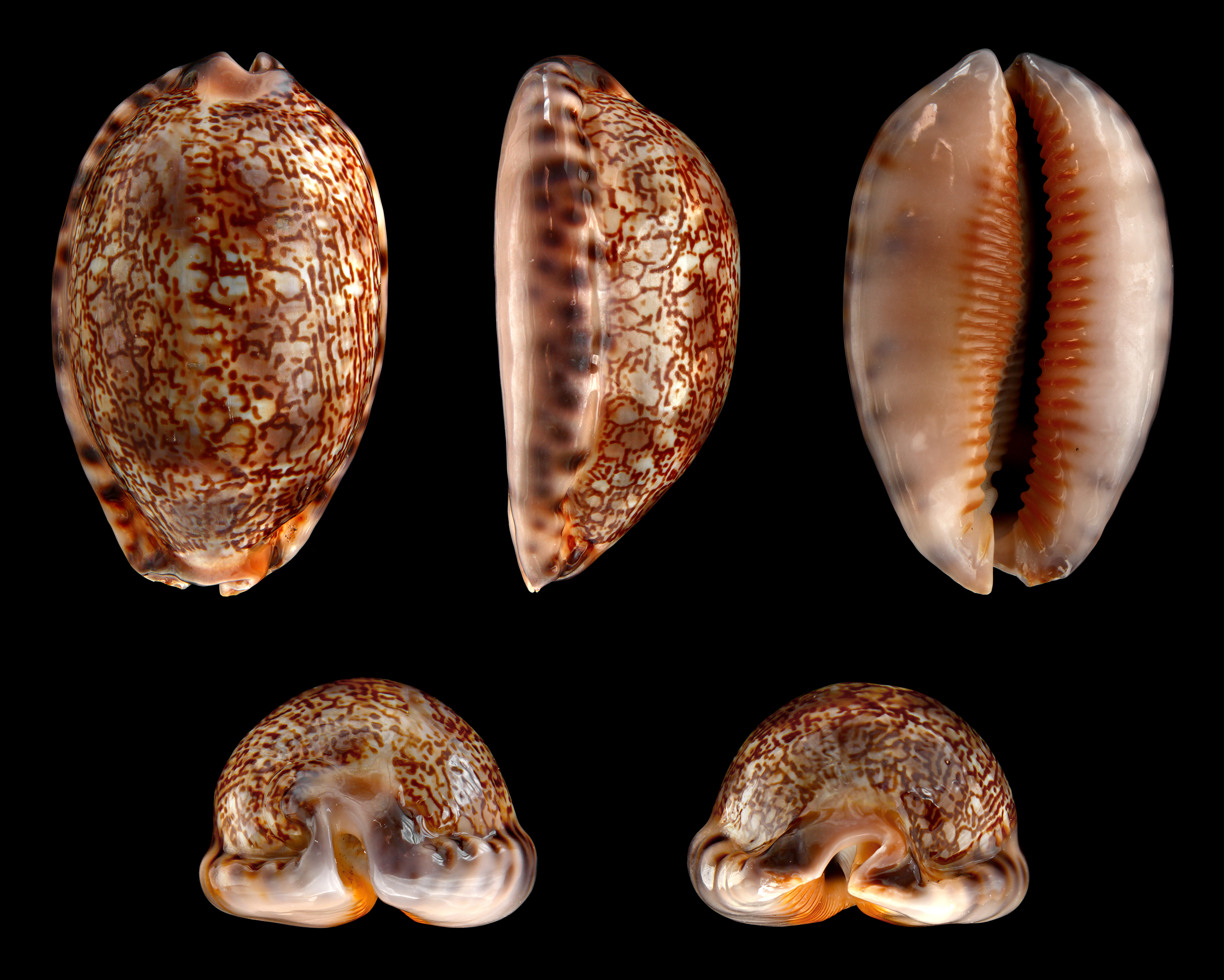
- Five views of a shell of Mauritia arabica
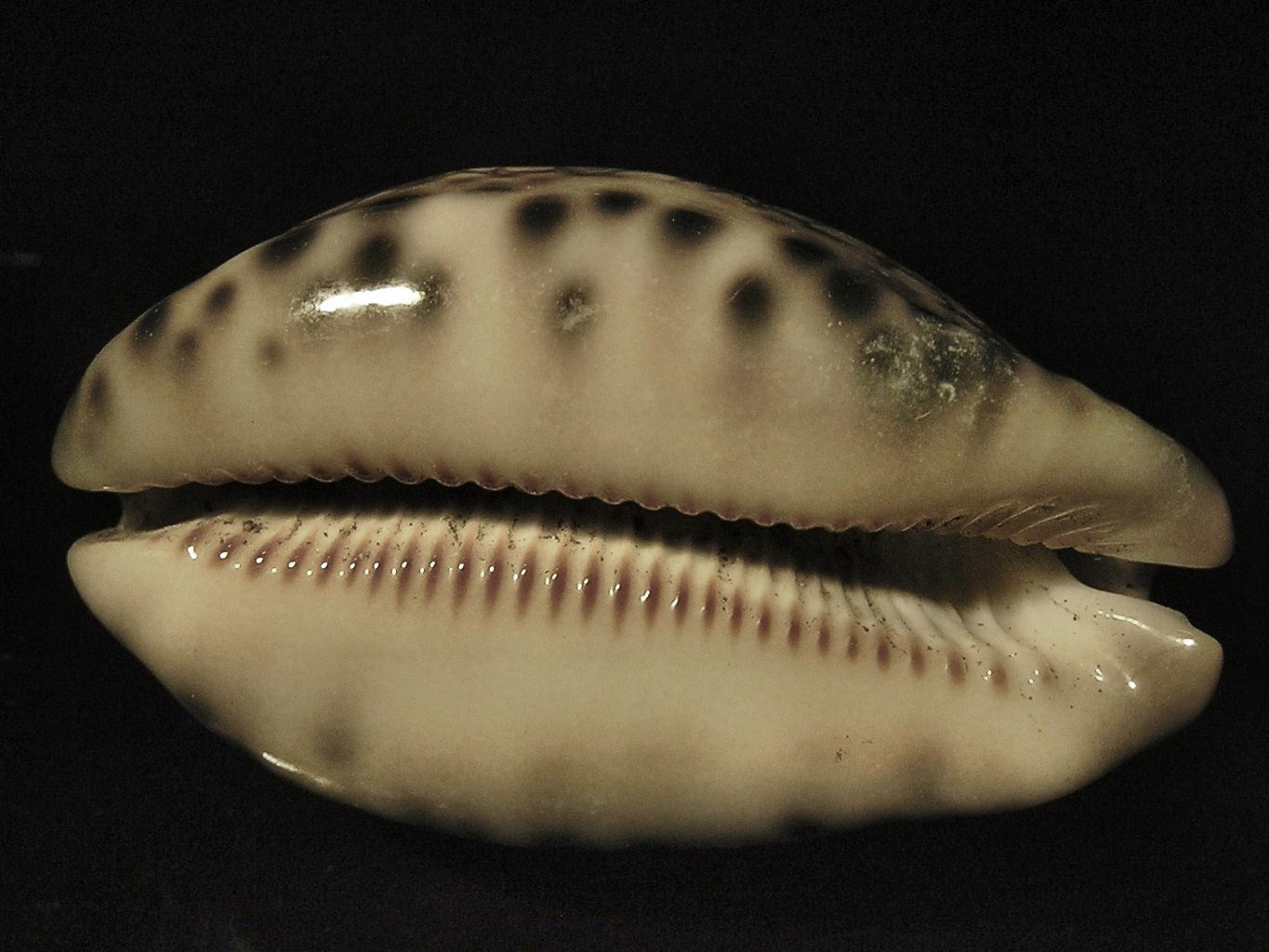
- An apertural view of a Mauritia histrio westralis, anterior end to the right

Scientific classification
- Kingdom: Animalia
- Phylum: Mollusca
- Class: Gastropoda
- Subclass: Caenogastropoda
- Order: Littorinimorpha
- Superfamily: Cypraeoidea
- Family: Cypraeidae
- Genus: Mauritia; Troschel, 1861

Type species
- Mauritia mauritiana Linnaeus, 1758

Synonyms
- Arabica Jousseaume, 1884; Cypraea (Mauritia) Troschel, 1863 (original rank); Maurina Jousseaume, 1884 (junior objective synonym of Mauritia); Mauritia (Arabica) Jousseaume, 1884; Mauritia (Mauritia) Troschel, 1863

= Mauritia (gastropod) =

Genus of gastropods

Mauritia is a genus of sea snails, marine gastropod molluscs in the family Cypraeidae, the cowries. These shelled molluscs are generally exclusive on the island of Mauritius, hence their name Mauritia.

== Species ==
Species within the genus Mauritia include:

- Mauritia arabica (Linnaeus, 1758)
- † Mauritia campbelliana (Pilsbry, 1922)
- Mauritia depressa (Gray)
- Mauritia eglantina (Duclos, 1833)
- Mauritia grayana Schilder, 1930
- Mauritia histrio (Gmelin, 1791)
- Mauritia maculifera Schilder, 1932
- Mauritia mauritiana (Linnaeus, 1758)
- Mauritia scurra (Gmelin, 1791)
- † Mauritia uzestensis Dolin & Lozouet, 2004

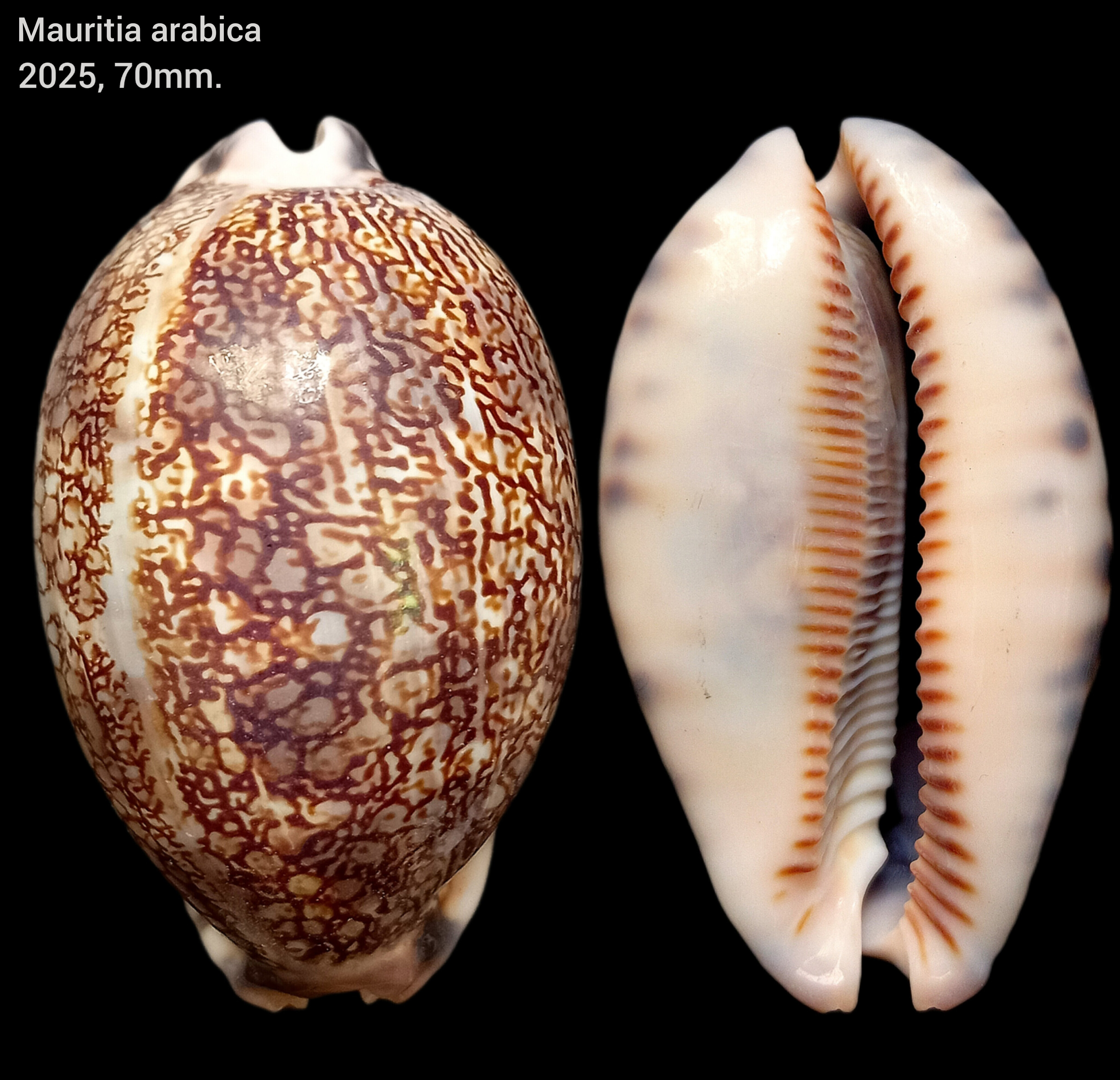
Mauritia arabica

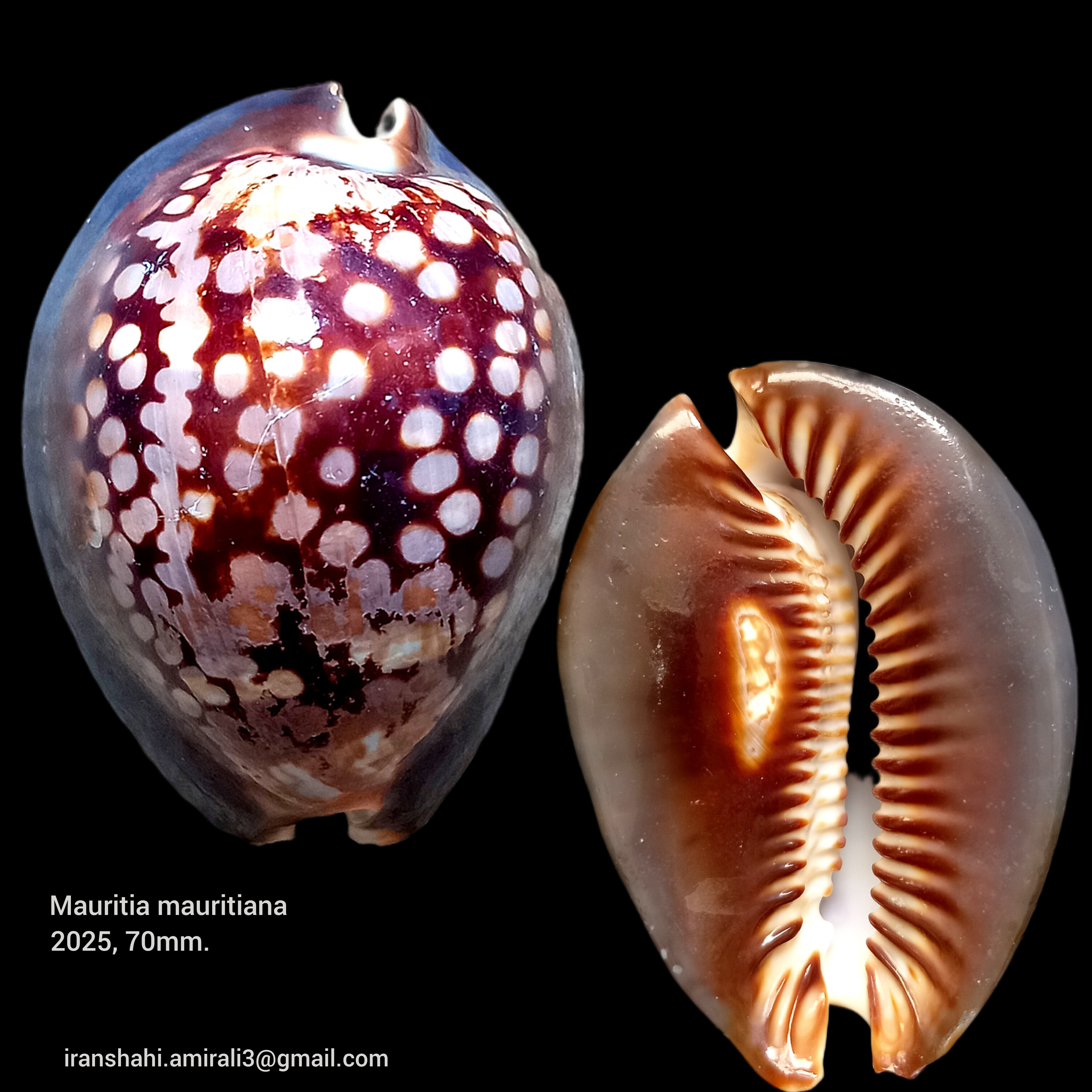
Mauritia mauritiana

Species brought into synonymy

- Mauritia mappa (Linnaeus, 1758): synonym of Leporicypraea mappa (Linnaeus, 1758)
