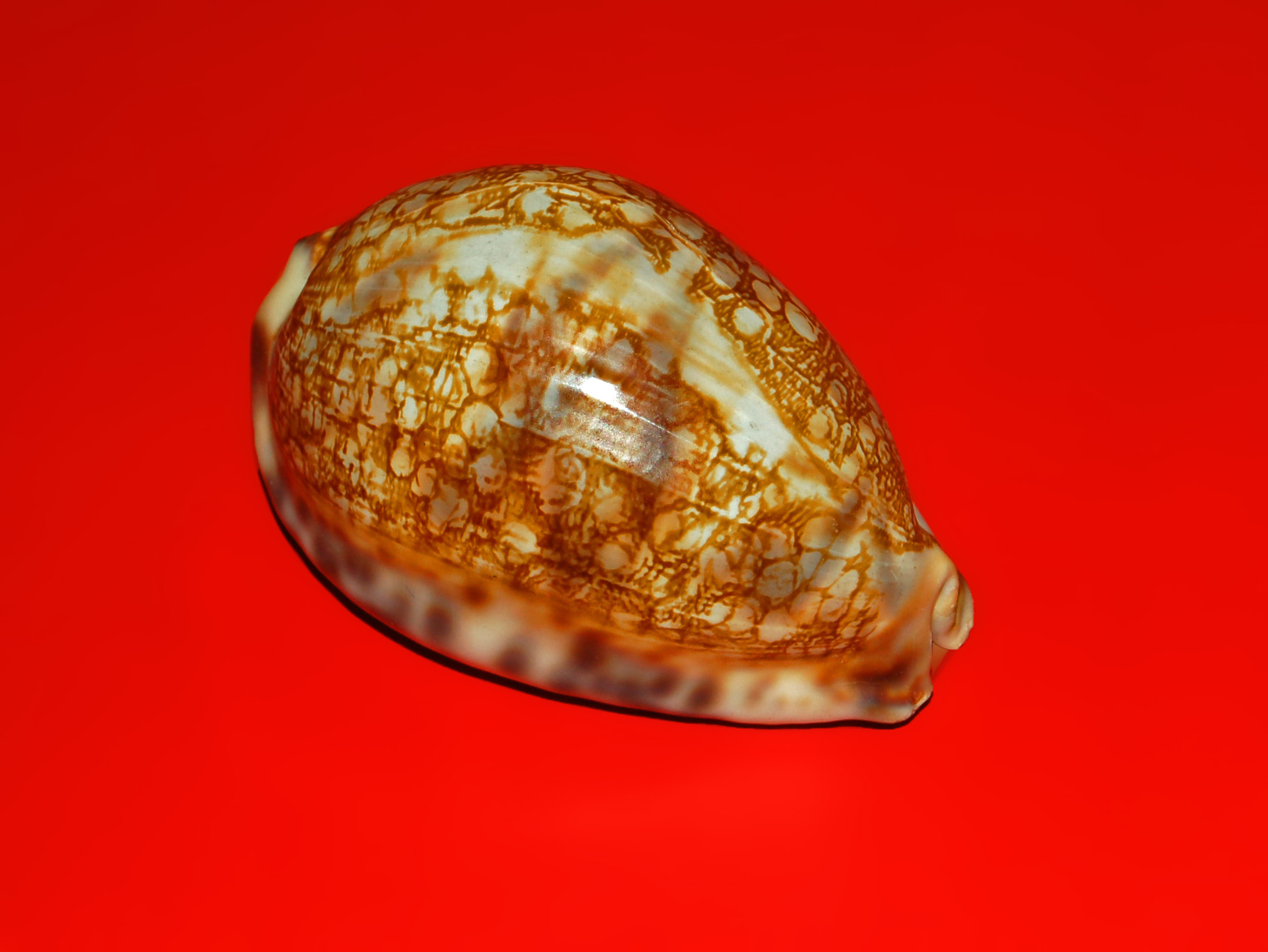
- Mauritia grayana, anterior end towards the right

Scientific classification
- Kingdom: Animalia
- Phylum: Mollusca
- Class: Gastropoda
- Subclass: Caenogastropoda
- Order: Littorinimorpha
- Family: Cypraeidae
- Genus: Mauritia
- Species: M. grayana

Binomial name
- Mauritia grayana Schilder, 1930

Synonyms
- Cypraea grayana (Schilder, 1930); Mauritia arabica grayana Schilder, 1930

= Mauritia grayana =

Species of gastropod

Mauritia grayana, the 'Gray's arabica cowry', is a species of sea snail, a cowry, a marine gastropod mollusk in the family Cypraeidae, the cowries.

Subspecies

- Mauritia grayana grayana Schilder, 1930
- Mauritia grayana ngai Thach, 2020

== Description ==
These quite common shells reach on average 44–52 millimetres (1.7–2.0 in) of length, with a maximum size of 80 millimetres (3.1 in) and a minimum size of 17 millimetres (0.67 in). Mauritia grayana has an oval, smooth and shiny shell. The dorsum surface is light gray-brown, with several gray spots and many thin longitudinal lines. In the middle of dorsum there is a wide longitudinal stripe. Close to the edges there is a grayish wide frame with several dark brown spots. The base is pale brown, with a wide aperture and fine dark brown teeth on outer and inner lips. In the living cowries the mantle is well developed, quite grayish and almost transparent, with short papillae and external antennae.

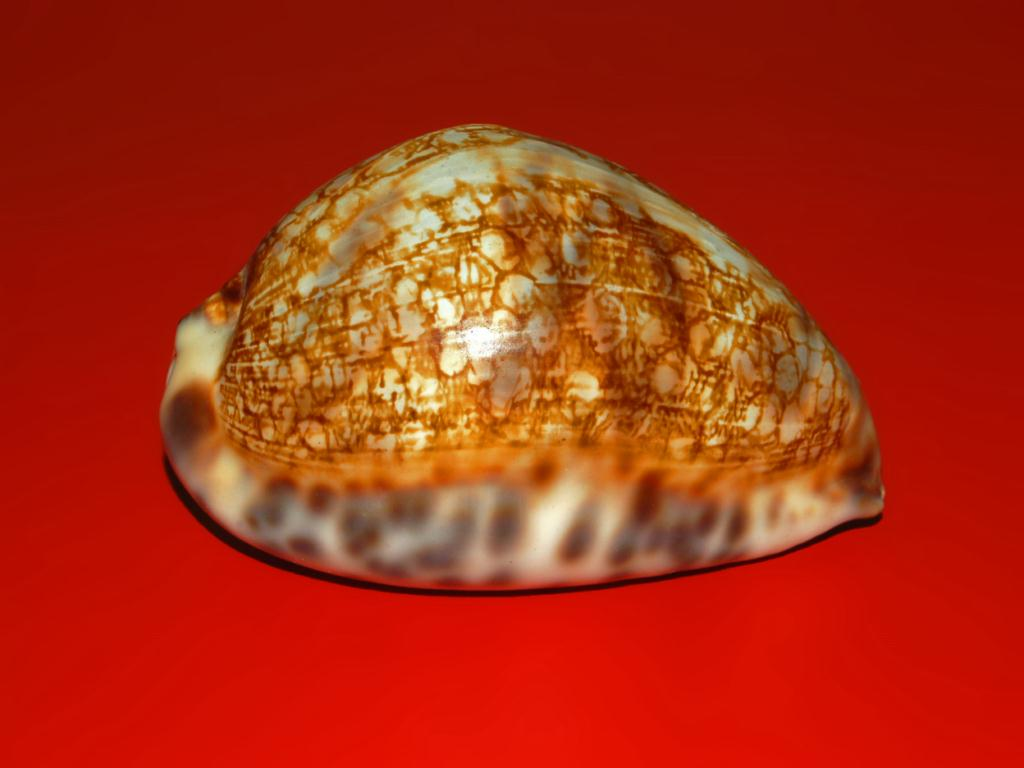
Mauritia grayana, side view, anterior end towards the right

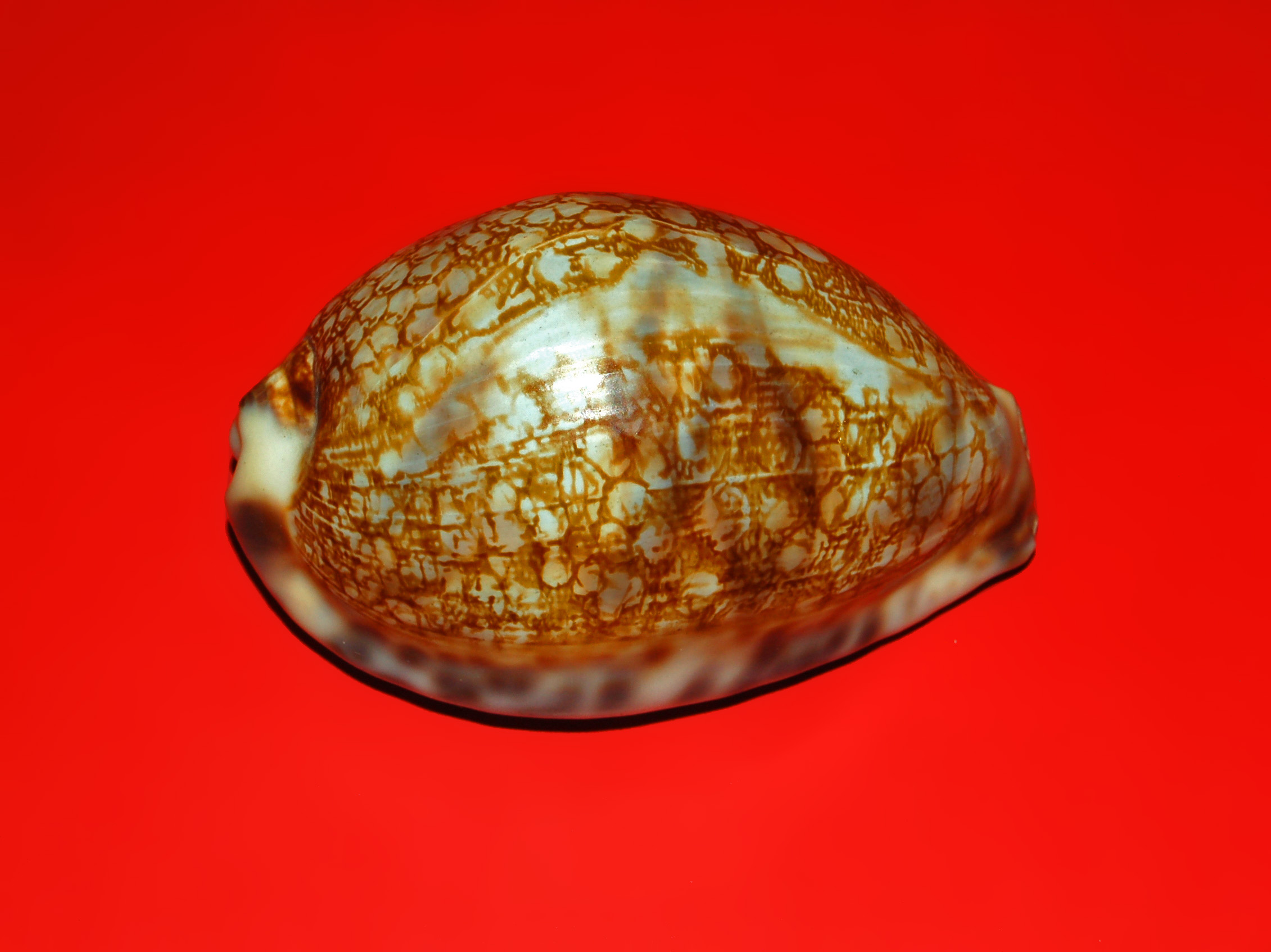
Mauritia grayana, dorsal view, anterior end towards the right

== Distribution ==
This Arabian endemic species is distributed in the Red Sea and in the Western Indian Ocean along Eritrea, Somalia and Pakistan.

== Habitat ==
These mollusks live in tropical shallow waters, mainly at about 2–5 metres (6 ft 7 in – 16 ft 5 in) of depth, often in the low intertidal zone. During the day the living cowries are usually hidden in coral caves or beneath the reef block, as they fear the light. They start feeding at dawn or dusk on sponges or coral polyps.
