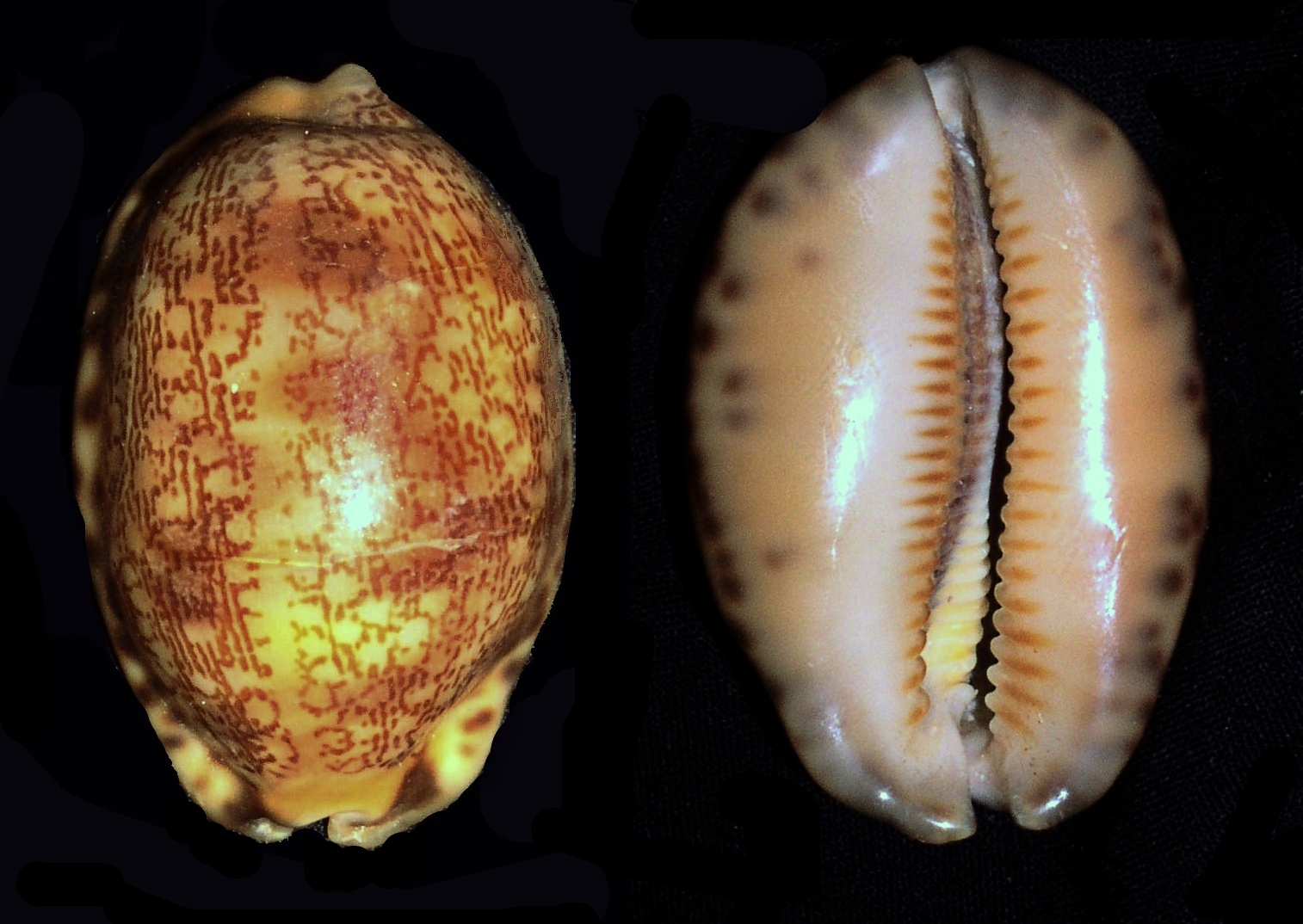

Scientific classification
- Kingdom: Animalia
- Phylum: Mollusca
- Class: Gastropoda
- Subclass: Caenogastropoda
- Order: Littorinimorpha
- Family: Cypraeidae
- Genus: Mauritia
- Species: M. eglantina

Binomial name
- Mauritia eglantina (Duclos, 1833)

Synonyms
- Cypraea eglantina Duclos, 1833 (basionym); Cypraea nigricans Crosse, 1875

= Mauritia eglantina =

Species of gastropod

Mauritia eglantina, the 'dog-rose cowry' or 'eglantine cowry', is a species of sea snail, a cowry, a marine gastropod mollusk in the family Cypraeidae, the cowries.

Subspecies

- Mauritia eglantina huberi Thach, 2018

== Description ==
These quite common shells reach on average 44–52 millimetres (1.7–2.0 in) of length, with a maximum size of 80 millimetres (3.1 in) and a minimum size of 27 millimetres (1.1 in). These cowries are rather elongated, smooth and shiny. The basic color of the dorsum is brown, with clear spots and many thin longitudinal lines. Almost in the middle of the dorsum there is a clearer longitudinal band. The base may be white, pale pink or pale brown. The edges show several brown dots. The teeth of the aperture are well developed. Mauritia eglantina can be easily confused with Mauritia arabica. In the living cowry the mantle is brown and thin.

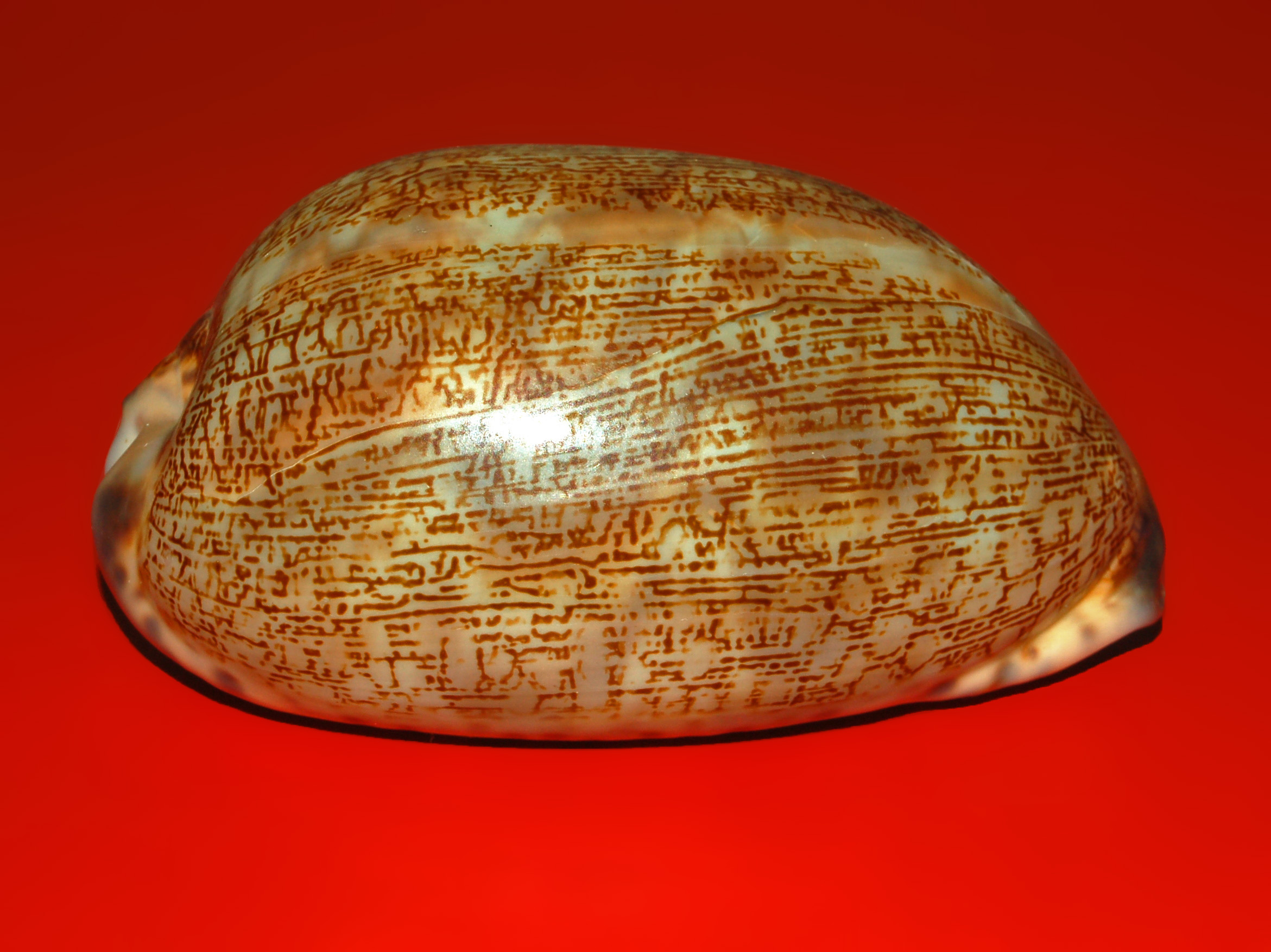
Mauritia eglantina, side view - Philippines

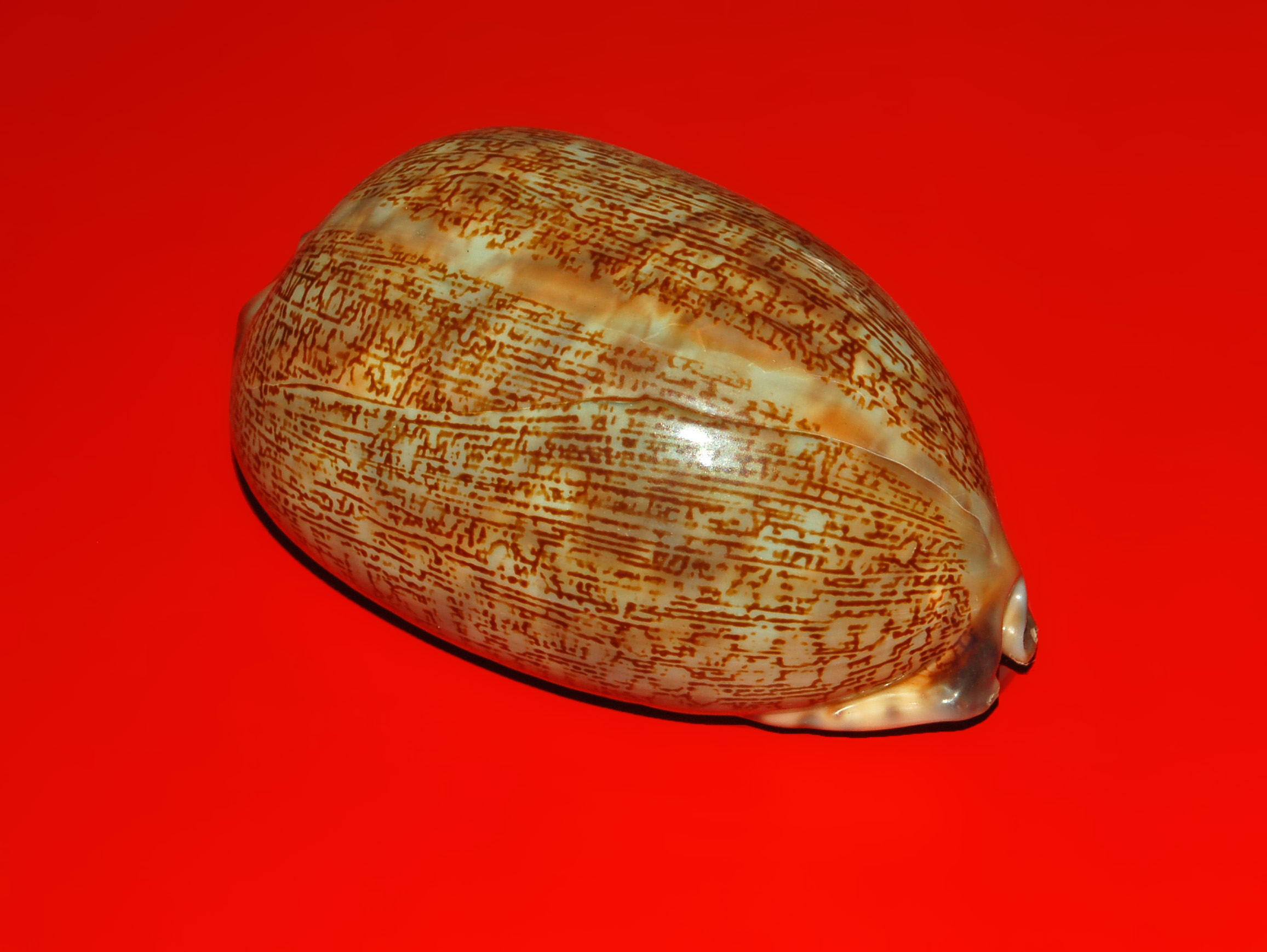
Mauritia eglantina, anterior end towards the right

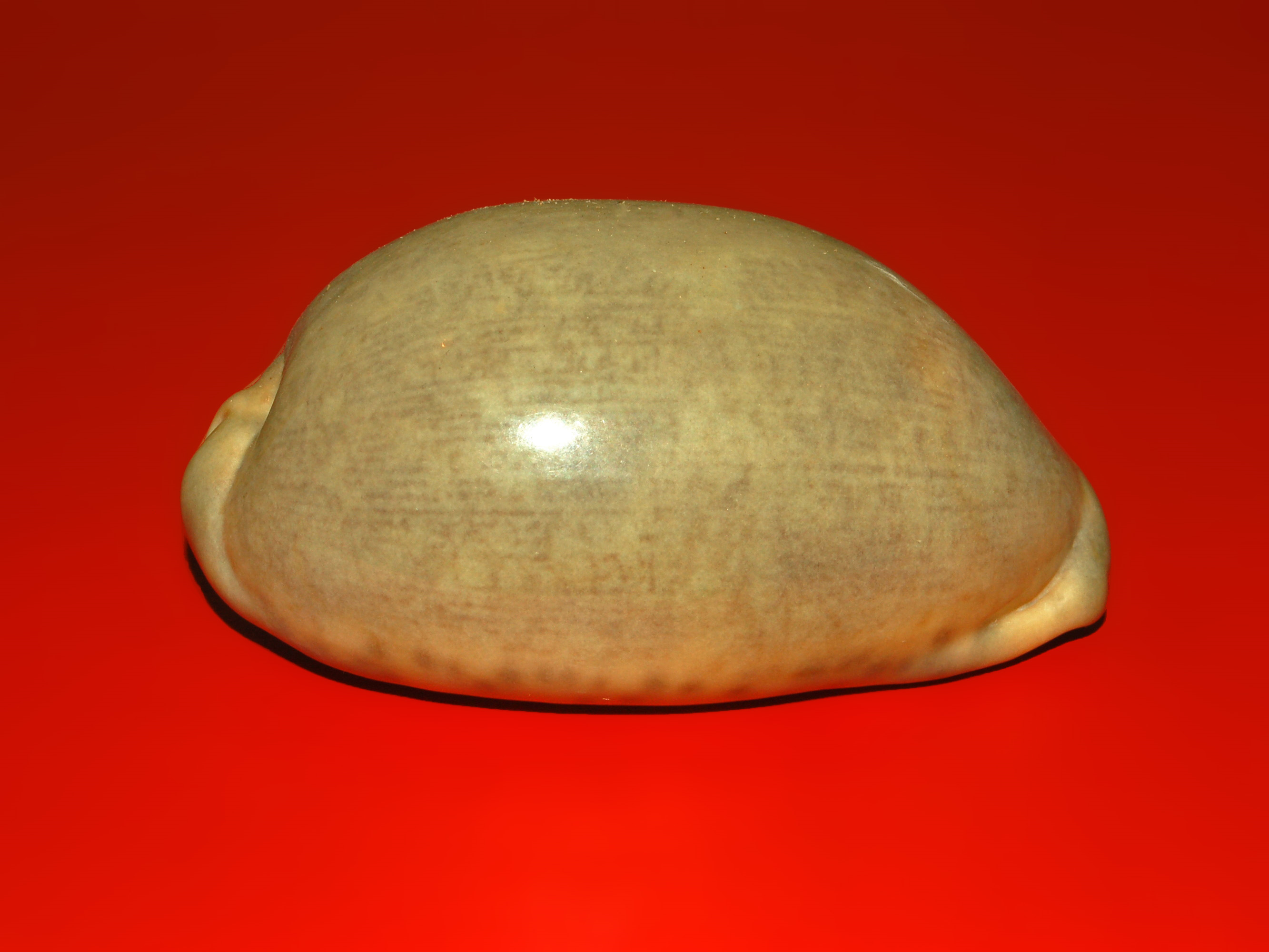
Mauritia eglantina var griseoviridis - Philippines

== Distribution ==
Mauritia eglantina is a species of Eastern Indian Ocean and Western Pacific Ocean, ranging from eastern Polynesia and Micronesia, Samoa Islands, New Caledonia up to Southeast Asia, Indonesia, Philippines and Northern Australia.

== Habitat ==
This species prefers rather shallow waters, lagoon reef habitats and coral rocks at 2–15 metres (6 ft 7 in – 49 ft 3 in) of depth.
