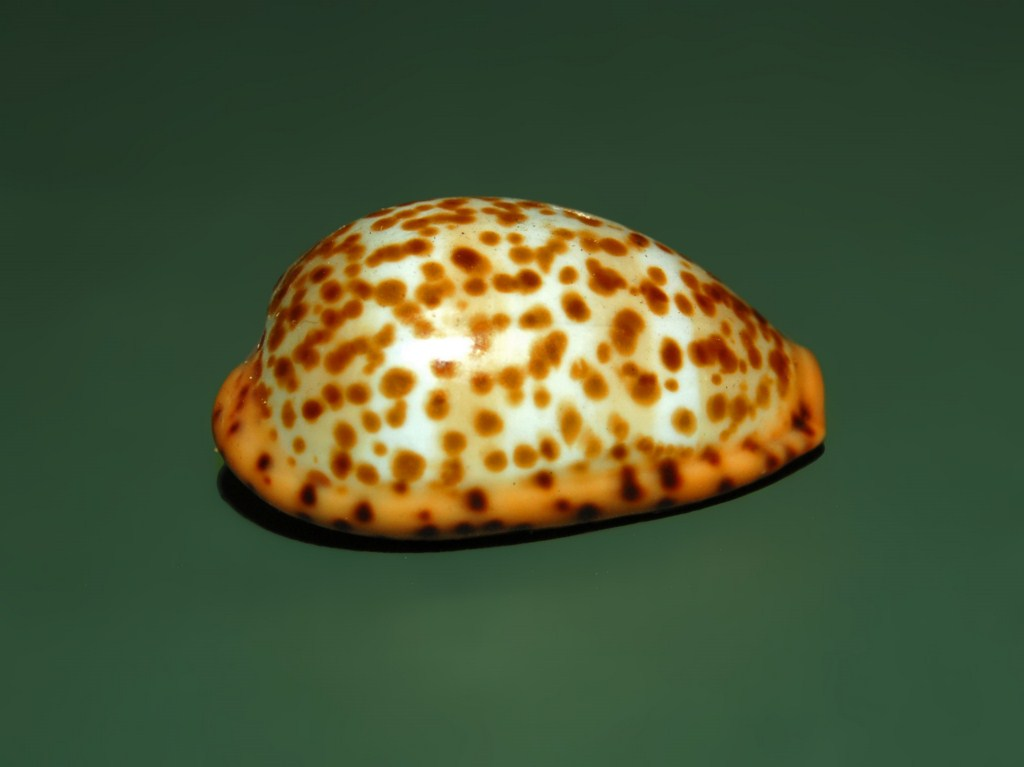
- Palmadusta humphreyii

Scientific classification
- Kingdom: Animalia
- Phylum: Mollusca
- Class: Gastropoda
- Subclass: Caenogastropoda
- Order: Littorinimorpha
- Superfamily: Cypraeoidea
- Family: Cypraeidae
- Genus: Palmadusta; Iredale, 1930

Type species
- Cypraea clandestina Linnaeus, C., 1767

Synonyms
- Cypraea (Palmadusta) Iredale, 1930; Evenaria Iredale, 1930; † Floradusta Petuch, 2003; Palmadusta (Palmadusta) Iredale, 1930

= Palmadusta =

Genus of gastropods

Palmadusta is a genus of sea snails, marine gastropod mollusks in the family Cypraeidae, the cowries.

== Species ==
Species within the genus Palmadusta include:

- Palmadusta androyensis Blocher & Lorenz, 1999
- Palmadusta artuffeli (Jousseaume, 1876)
- Palmadusta asellus (Linnaeus, 1758)
- Palmadusta clandestina (Linnaeus, 1767)
- Palmadusta contaminata (Sowerby I, 1832)
- Palmadusta diluculum (Reeve, 1845)
- Palmadusta humphreyii Gray, 1825
- Palmadusta johnsonorum Lorenz, 2002
- Palmadusta lentiginosa (Gray, 1825)
- Palmadusta lutea (Gmelin, 1791)
- Palmadusta saulae (Gaskoin, 1843)
- Palmadusta ziczac (Linnaeus, 1758)

Species brought into synonymy

- Palmadusta barbieri Raybaudi, 1986: synonym of Purpuradusta barbieri (Raybaudi, 1986) (original combination)
- Palmadusta consanguinea Blöcher & Lorenz, 2000: synonym of Palmadusta androyensis consanguinea Blöcher & Lorenz, 2000
- Palmadusta felina (Gmelin, 1791): synonym of Melicerona felina (Gmelin, 1791)
- Palmadusta fimbriata (Gmelin, 1791): synonym of Purpuradusta fimbriata (Gmelin, 1791)
- Palmadusta gracilis (Gaskoin, 1849): synonym of Purpuradusta gracilis (Gaskoin, 1849)
- Palmadusta humphreysii (Gray, 1825): synonym of Palmadusta humphreyii (Gray, 1825) (Incorrect original spelling, see taxonomic note)
- Palmadusta pseudolutea Ma, 1997: synonym of Palmadusta saulae (Gaskoin, 1843)
- Palmadusta punctata (Linnaeus, 1771): synonym of Ransoniella punctata (Linnaeus, 1771)
- Palmadusta serrulifera F. A. Schilder & M. Schilder, 1938: synonym of Purpuradusta serrulifera (F. A. Schilder & M. Schilder, 1938) (original combination)
