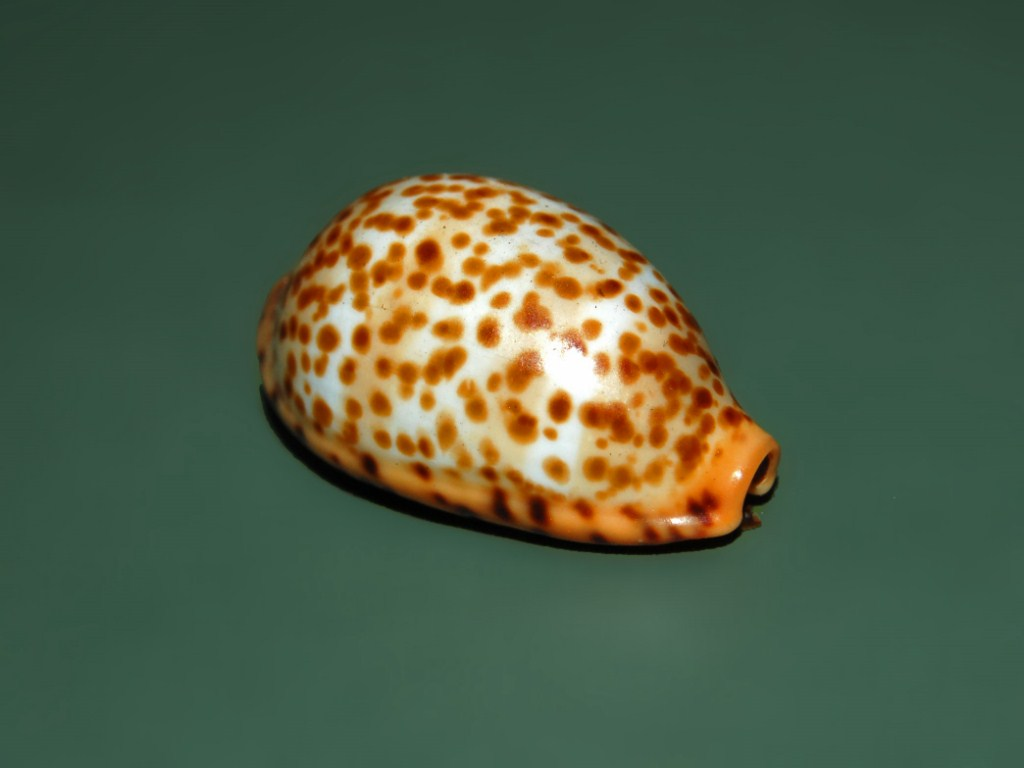
- A shell of Palmadusta humphreyii from Solomon Islands, anterior end towards the right

Scientific classification
- Kingdom: Animalia
- Phylum: Mollusca
- Class: Gastropoda
- Subclass: Caenogastropoda
- Order: Littorinimorpha
- Family: Cypraeidae
- Genus: Palmadusta
- Species: P. humphreyii

Binomial name
- Palmadusta humphreyii Gray, 1825

Synonyms
- Cypraea humphreysii Gray, 1825; Palmadusta humphreysii humphreisii (Gray, 1825) · accepted, alternate representation; Palmadusta lutea yaloka Steadman & Cotton, 1943

= Palmadusta humphreyii =

Species of gastropod

Palmadusta humphreyii, common name : Humphrey's cowrie, is a species of sea snail, a cowry, a marine gastropod mollusk in the family Cypraeidae, the cowries.

== Spelling ==
The epithet humphreysii is an incorrect original spelling that was corrected by Gray himself in the errata page of the same volume of the Journal. See Petit (2012: 91):

"11. The species name humphreyii was on page 489, in error, as humphreysii. This was corrected by Gray on the Errata page [603] of the same volume of the Journal. This is a correct and valid emendation under I.C.Z.N. Article 32.5.1.1. The name with its original incorrect spelling is in current usage, the errata sheet evidently having been overlooked by Cypraea specialists. Iredale & McMichael (1962: 61) list “humphreyii (humphreysii errore)” but do not mention the errata page. Schilder & Schilder (1971: 122) attributed that usage to Iredale & McMichael and listed it as “published in a not valid way” in the synonymy of Palmadusta lutea humphreysii on page 52."

This action, therefore, restores the original correct spelling of humphreyii. (FM, 2015-02-27).

== Description ==
These quite uncommon shells reach on average 10–25 millimetres (0.39–0.98 in) of length. The basic color and pattern of this species are quite variable. The dorsum surface is smooth and shiny, its color is white or pale pink, with many brown spots, while the edges and the extremities are orange with darker spots extended to the base. The underside may be orange, pale yellow, pale brown or pale pink, with a narrow sinuous aperture and well-developed teeth. In the living cowries the mantle is bright red, the mantle and the foot are well developed, with short papillae and external antennae.

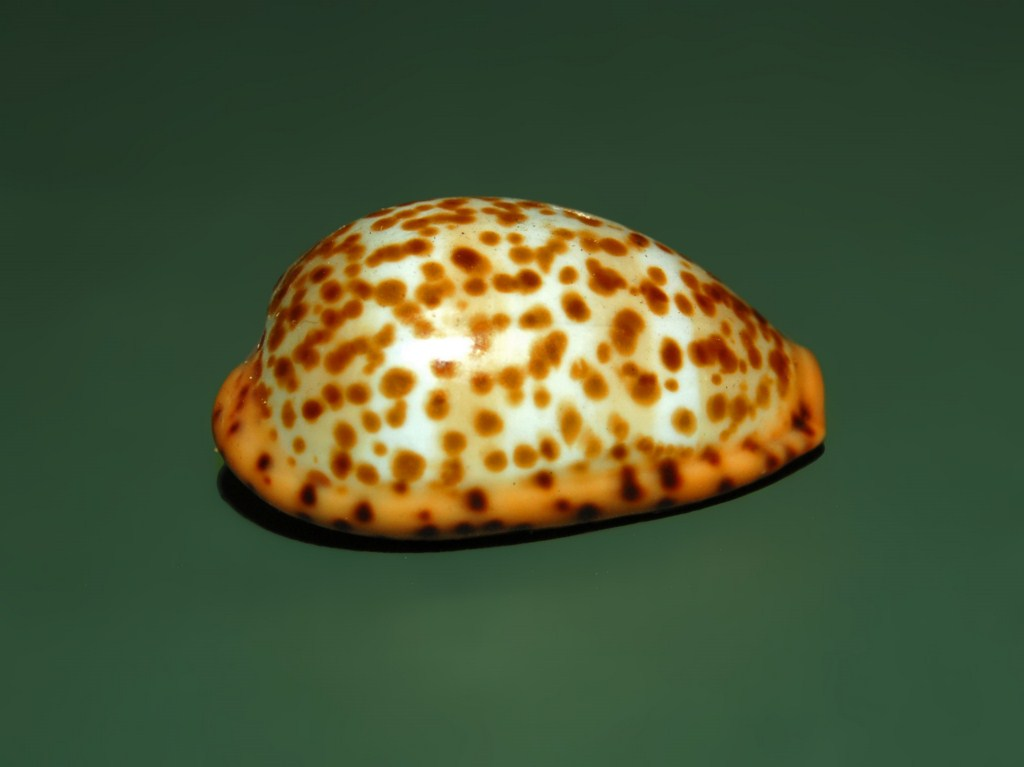
A shell of Palmadusta humphreyii from Solomon Islands, lateral view

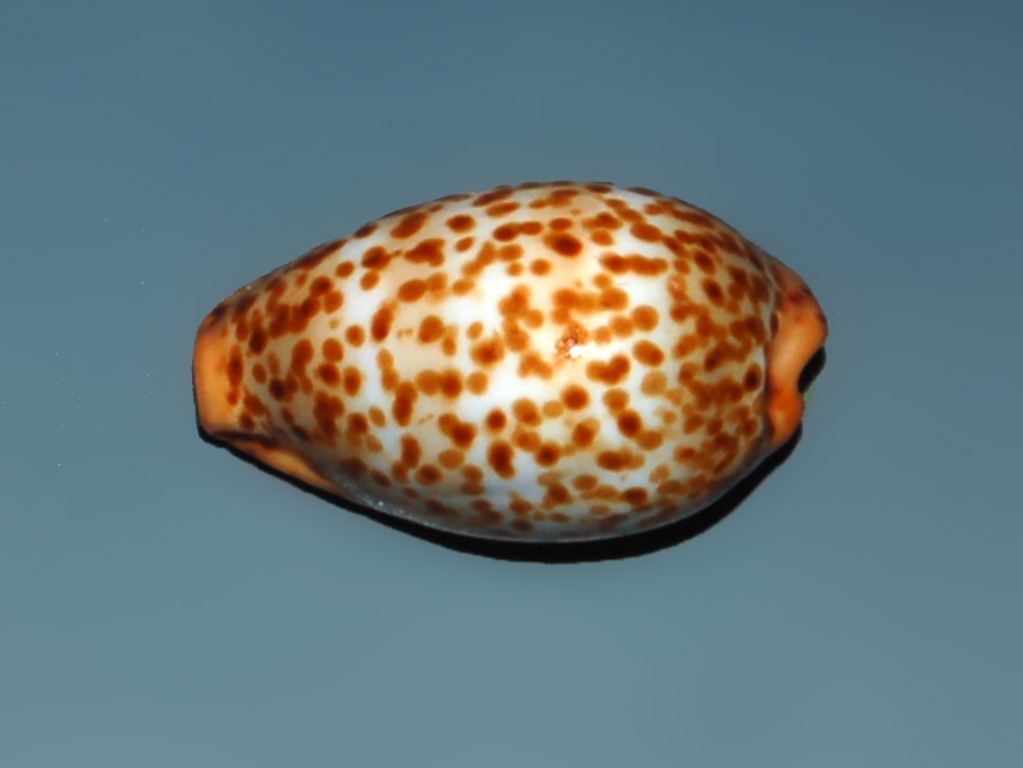
Palmadusta humphreyii, dorsal view, anterior end towards the left

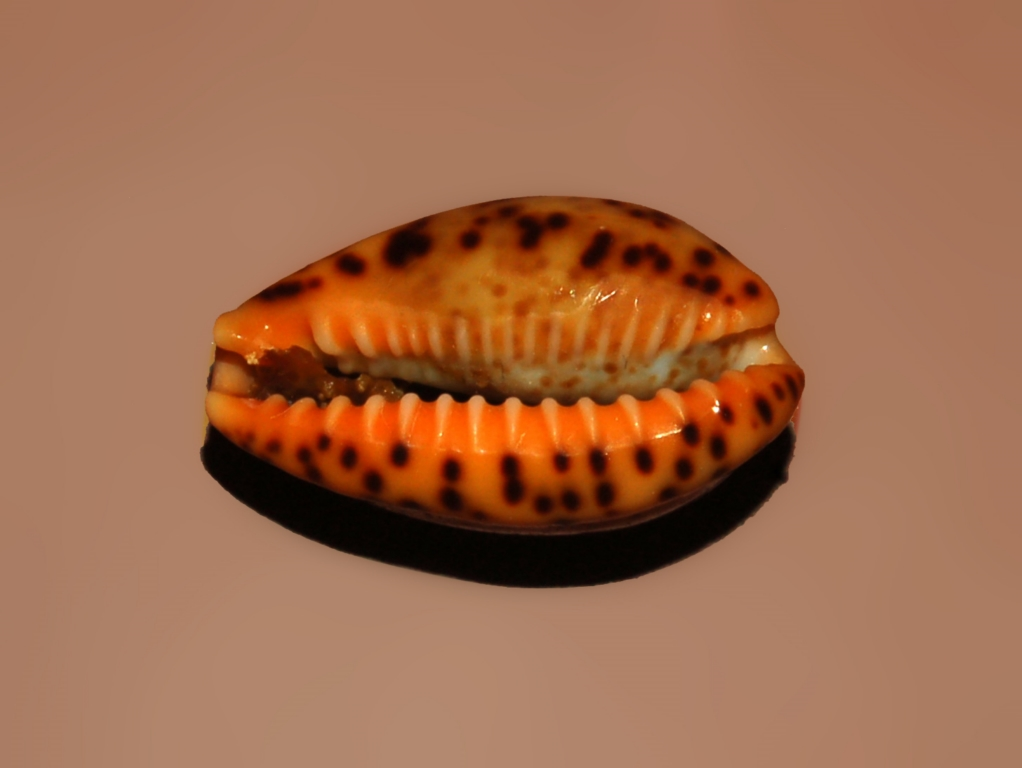
Palmadusta humphreyii, apertural view, anterior end towards the left

== Distribution ==
This endemic species occurs in the sea along East Africa and Western Pacific Ocean (Malaysia, Queensland, New South Wales, Papua New Guinea, New Caledonia, Solomon Islands, Tonga, Fiji).

== Habitat ==
These cowries live in shallow water on coral reef at 5–25 millimetres (0.20–0.98 in) of depth, usually hiding under coral and rocks, feeding on algae or coral polyps.

== Subspecies ==
- Palmadusta humphreysii humphreisii (Gray, 1825) . accepted, alternate representation
- Palmadusta humphreysii yaloka Steadman & Cotton, 1943: synonym of Palmadusta humphreyii (Gray, 1825)
- Palmadusta humphreysii f. "coccinella" Lorenz and Hubert, 2000: synonym of Palmadusta johnsonorum Lorenz, 2002
