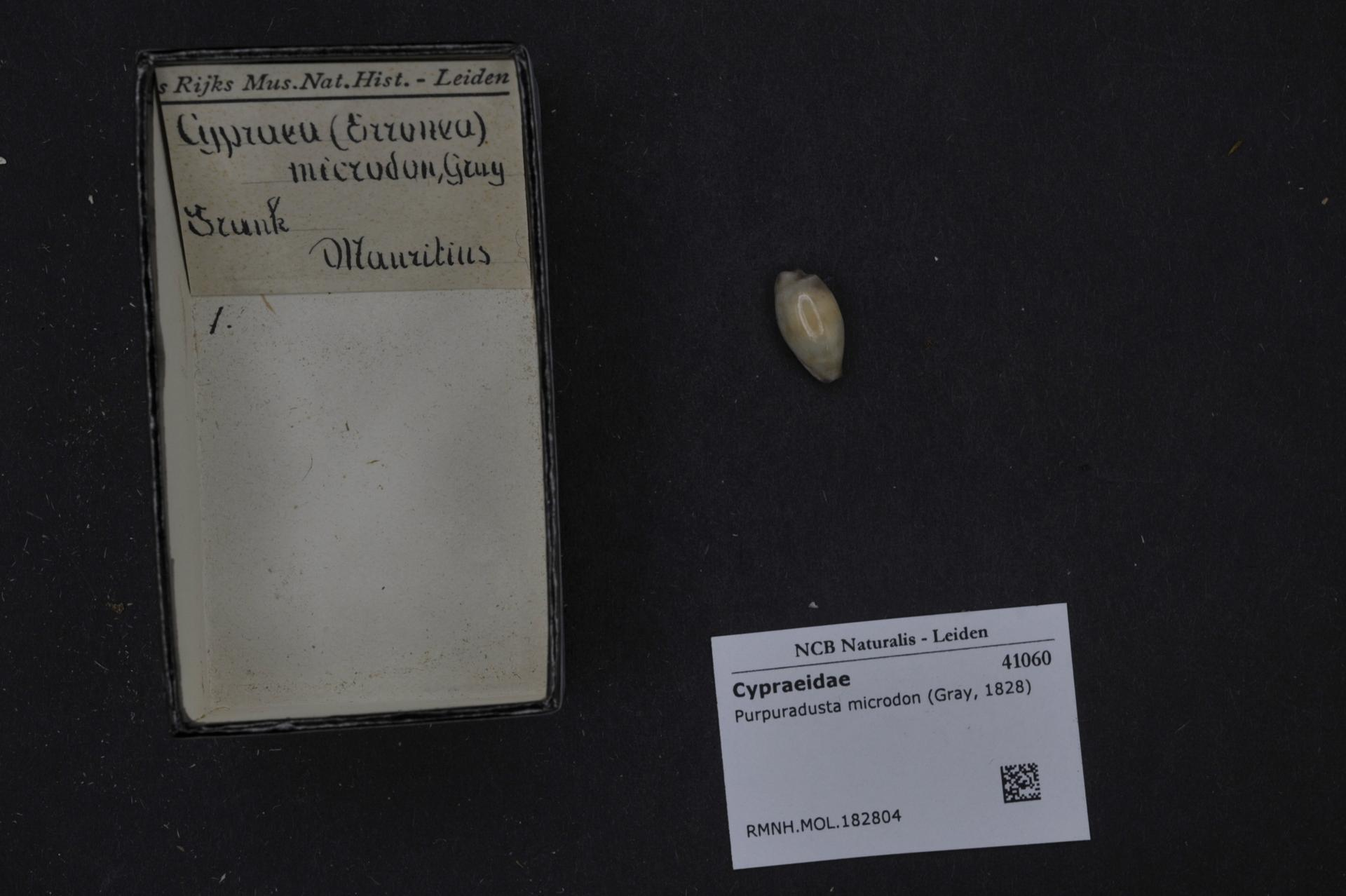
- Purpuradusta microdon

Scientific classification
- Kingdom: Animalia
- Phylum: Mollusca
- Class: Gastropoda
- Subclass: Caenogastropoda
- Order: Littorinimorpha
- Family: Cypraeidae
- Genus: Purpuradusta
- Species: P. microdon

Binomial name
- Purpuradusta microdon (Gray, 1828).

Synonyms
- Cypraea microdon Gray, 1828 (basionym)

= Purpuradusta microdon =

Species of gastropod

Purpuradusta microdon is species of tropical sea snail, a cowry, a marine gastropod mollusk in the family Cypraeidae, the cowries. This species lives in the Indo-Pacific oceans.

The shell of this cowry closely resembles that of Purpuradusta minoridens.

Subspecies

- Purpuradusta microdon microdon (Gray, 1828)
- Purpuradusta microdon chrysalis (Kiener, 1843)

== Distribution ==
This species is distributed in the Red Sea and in the Indian Ocean along Chagos, Kenya, the Mascarene Basin, Mauritius and Tanzania.
