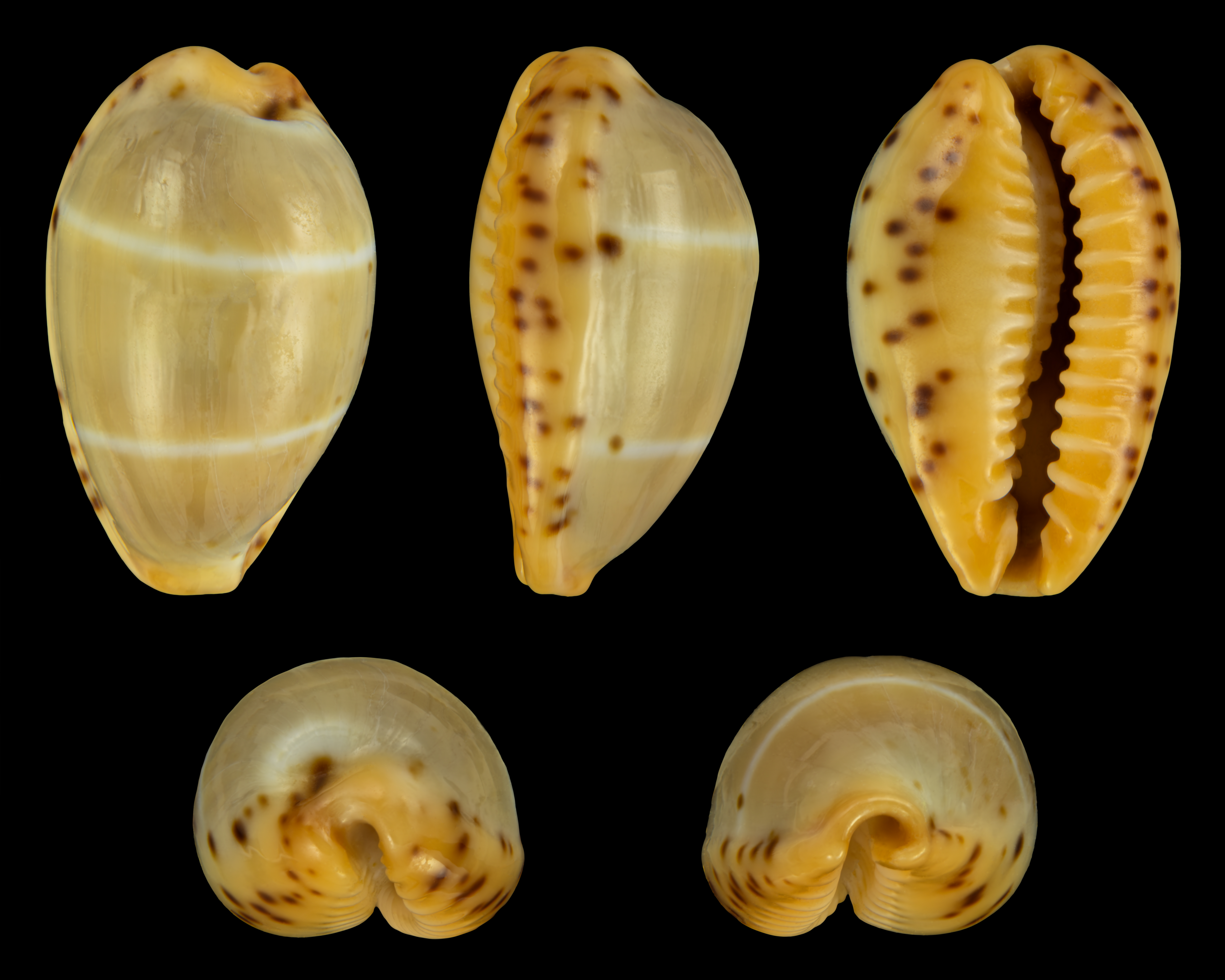

Scientific classification
- Kingdom: Animalia
- Phylum: Mollusca
- Class: Gastropoda
- Subclass: Caenogastropoda
- Order: Littorinimorpha
- Family: Cypraeidae
- Genus: Palmadusta
- Species: P. lutea

Binomial name
- Palmadusta lutea (Gmelin, 1791)

Synonyms
- Cypraea lutea Gmelin, 1791

= Palmadusta lutea =

Species of gastropod

Palmadusta lutea is a species of sea snail, a cowry, a marine gastropod mollusk in the family Cypraeidae, the cowries.
