= Palmadusta clandestina =

Scientific classification
- Kingdom: Animalia
- Phylum: Mollusca
- Class: Gastropoda
- Subclass: Caenogastropoda
- Order: Littorinimorpha
- Family: Cypraeidae
- Genus: Palmadusta
- Species: P. clandestina

Binomial name
- Palmadusta clandestina (Linnaeus, 1767)

Synonyms
- Cypraea clandestina Linnaeus, 1767 (basionym)

Species of gastropod

Palmadusta clandestina is a species of sea snail, a cowry, a marine gastropod mollusk in the family Cypraeidae, the cowries.

Subspecies

Palmadusta clandestina passerina

- Palmadusta clandestina candida (Pease, 1865)
- Palmadusta clandestina clandestina (Linnaeus, 1767)
- Palmadusta clandestina passerina Melvill, 1888

== Description ==
Palmadusta clandestina has the flat-sided egg shape typical of cowries, and is around 26 mm long. It is one of several Cypraeoidea known to use acid for defence, in this case secreting sulphuric acid when disturbed.

== Distribution ==
This species is distributed in the Red Sea and in the Indian Ocean along Aldabra, Chagos, the Comores, Kenya, Madagascar, the Mascarene Basin, Mauritius, Réunion, the Seychelles, Somalia and Tanzania
