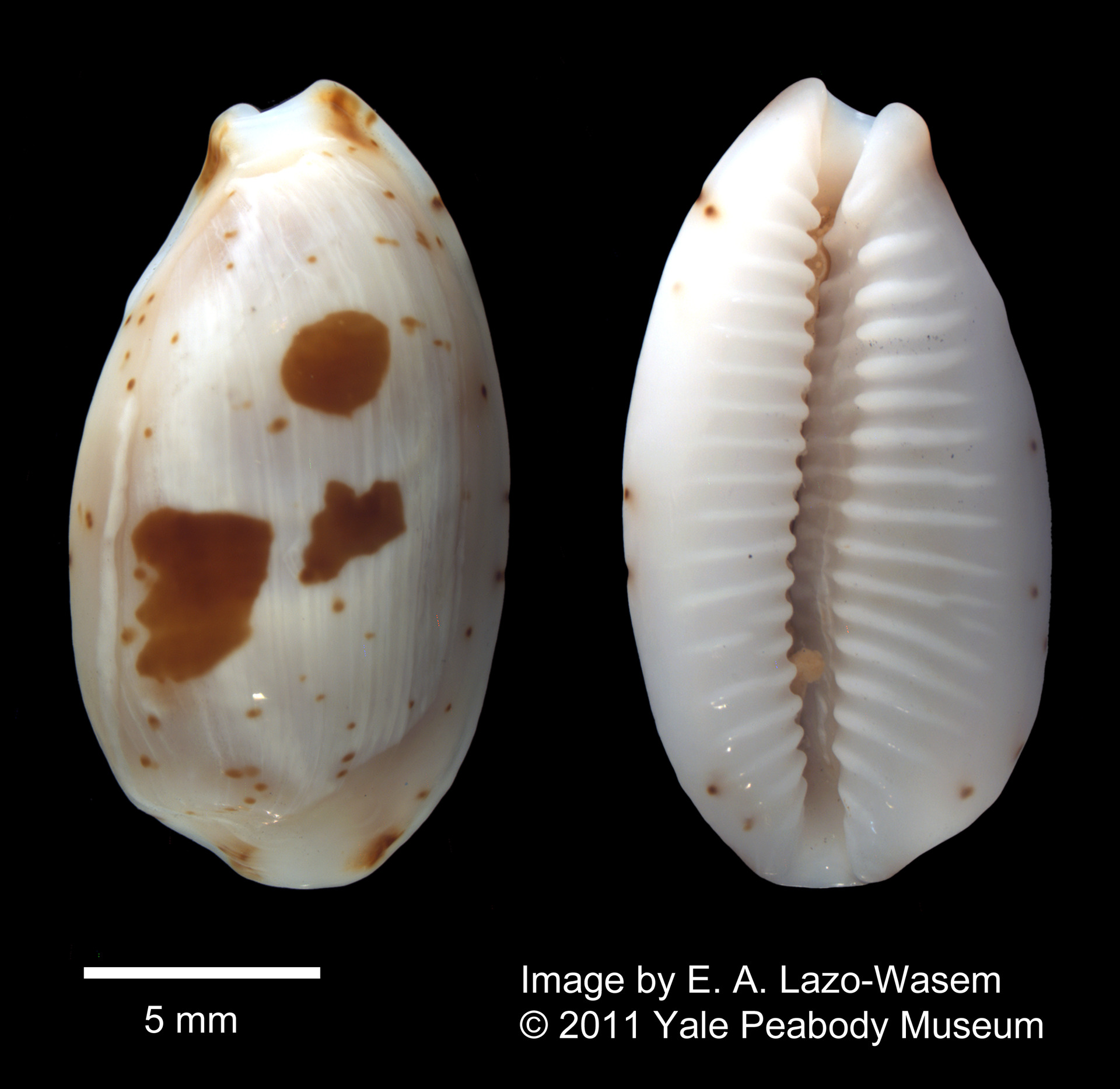
- Preserved specimen of almadusta contaminata

Scientific classification
- Kingdom: Animalia
- Phylum: Mollusca
- Class: Gastropoda
- Subclass: Caenogastropoda
- Order: Littorinimorpha
- Family: Cypraeidae
- Genus: Palmadusta
- Species: P. contaminata

Binomial name
- Palmadusta contaminata (Sowerby I, 1832)

Synonyms
- Cypraea contaminata Sowerby I, 1832

= Palmadusta contaminata =

Species of gastropod

Palmadusta contaminata is a species of sea snail, a cowry, a marine gastropod mollusk in the family Cypraeidae, the cowries.

Subspecies

- Palmadusta contaminata contaminata (Sowerby I, 1832)
- Palmadusta contaminata distans Schilder

== Distribution ==
This species occurs in the Indian Ocean along the Mascarene Basin, Mauritius, Réunion and Tanzania.
