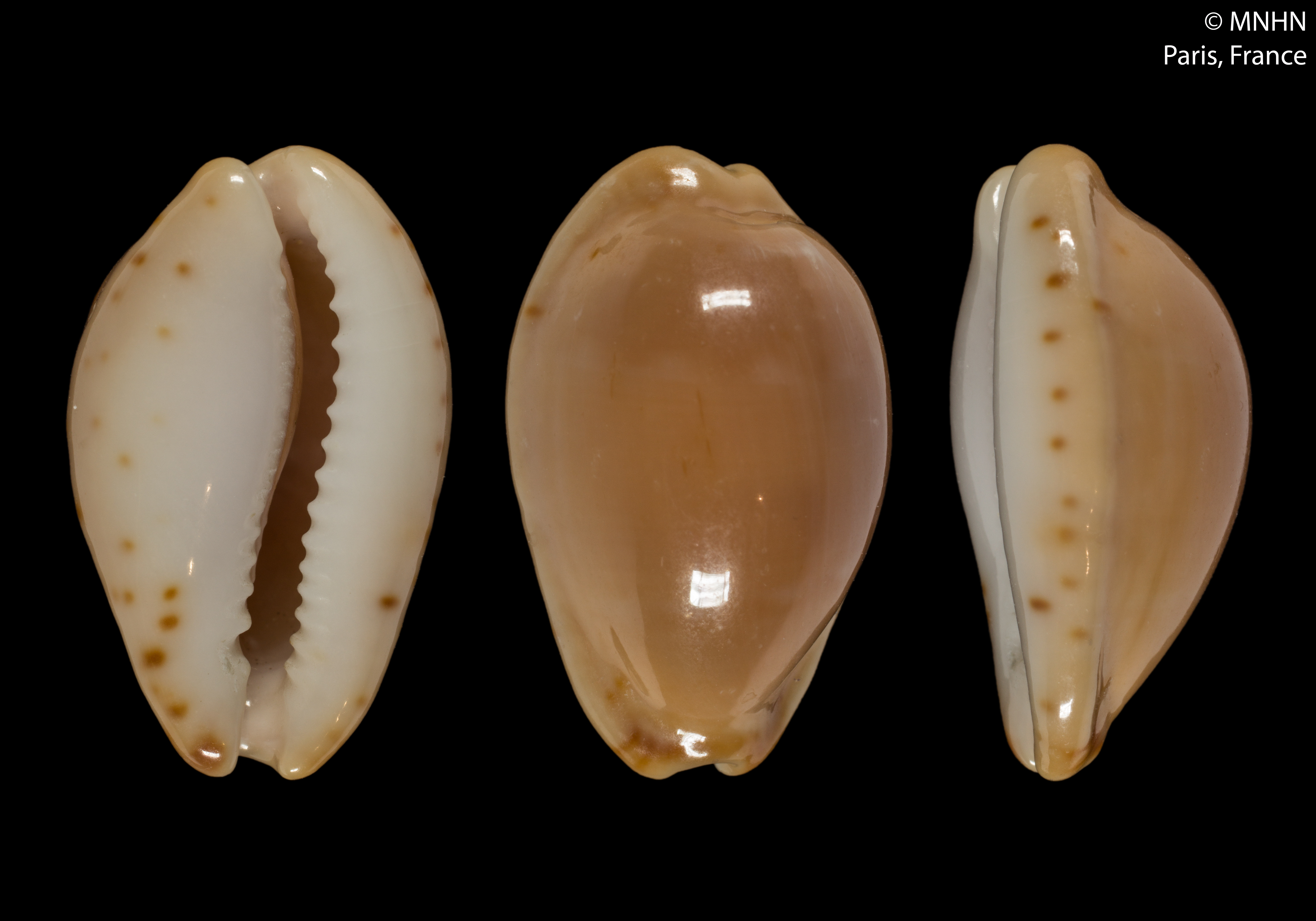
- Shell of Palmadusta androyensis ipacoyana (holotype at MNHN, Paris)

Scientific classification
- Kingdom: Animalia
- Phylum: Mollusca
- Class: Gastropoda
- Subclass: Caenogastropoda
- Order: Littorinimorpha
- Family: Cypraeidae
- Genus: Palmadusta
- Species: P. androyensis

Binomial name
- Palmadusta androyensis Blöcher & Lorenz, 1999

= Palmadusta androyensis =

Species of gastropod

Palmadusta androyensis is a species of sea snail, a cowry, a marine gastropod mollusk in the family Cypraeidae, the cowries.

There are three subspecies:

- Palmadusta androyensis androyensis Blocher & Lorenz, 1999
- Palmadusta androyensis consanguinea Blöcher & Lorenz, 2000
- Palmadusta androyensis ipacoyana Bozzetti, 2006

== Description ==
The adult shell size varies between 14 mm and 19.4 mm.

== Distribution ==
This species occurs in the Indian Ocean off East Africa and Madagascar.
