= Purpuradusta oryzaeformis =

Scientific classification
- Kingdom: Animalia
- Phylum: Mollusca
- Class: Gastropoda
- Subclass: Caenogastropoda
- Order: Littorinimorpha
- Family: Cypraeidae
- Genus: Purpuradusta
- Species: P. oryzaeformis

Binomial name
- Purpuradusta oryzaeformis Lorenz & Sterba, 1999

Species of mollusc

Purpuradusta oryzaeformis is a species of sea snail, a cowry, a marine gastropod mollusk in the family Cypraeidae, the cowries.
