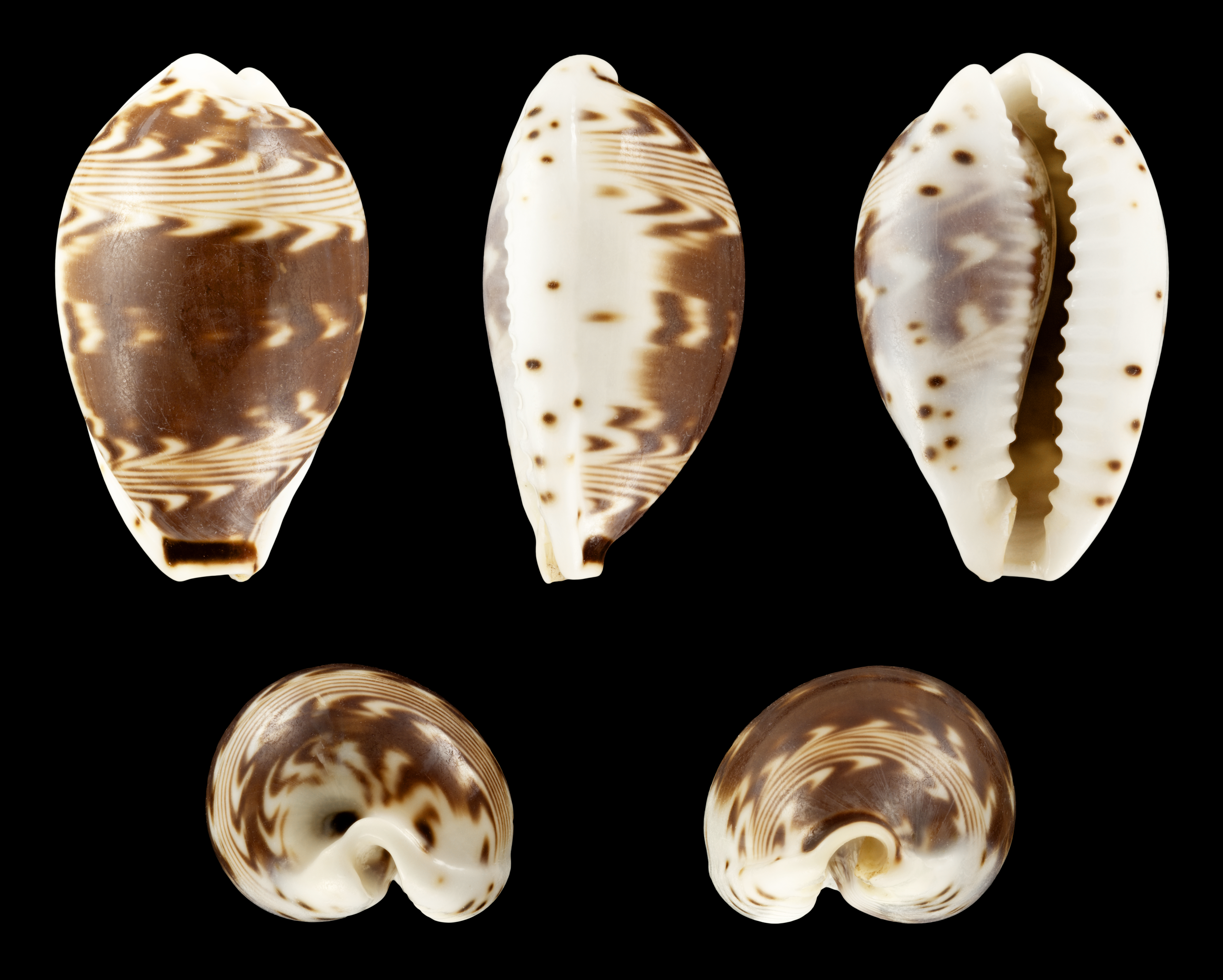

Scientific classification
- Kingdom: Animalia
- Phylum: Mollusca
- Class: Gastropoda
- Subclass: Caenogastropoda
- Order: Littorinimorpha
- Family: Cypraeidae
- Genus: Palmadusta
- Species: P. diluculum

Binomial name
- Palmadusta diluculum (Reeve, 1845)

Synonyms
- Cypraea diluculum Reeve, 1845 (basionym)

= Palmadusta diluculum =

Species of gastropod

Palmadusta diluculum, the day-break cowry, is a species of sea snail, a cowry, a marine gastropod mollusk in the family Cypraeidae, the cowries.

== Description ==
These quite common schnecken reach on average 25–29 millimetres (0.98–1.14 in) of length, with a maximum size of 36 millimetres (1.4 in) and a minimum size of 25 millimetres (0.98 in). The shape of these shells is somewhat pyriformly ovate, the basic coloration is brown or violet-chesnut, with two or more zones of several white dorsal zigzag-bands and distinctive dark spots on the white base. The extremities are edged with dark chesnut areas. In the living cowry the mantle is thin and smooth. The Palmadusta diluculum virginalis subspecies is smaller, the terminal spots are less accentuated to absent and dark spots on the base are totally missing.

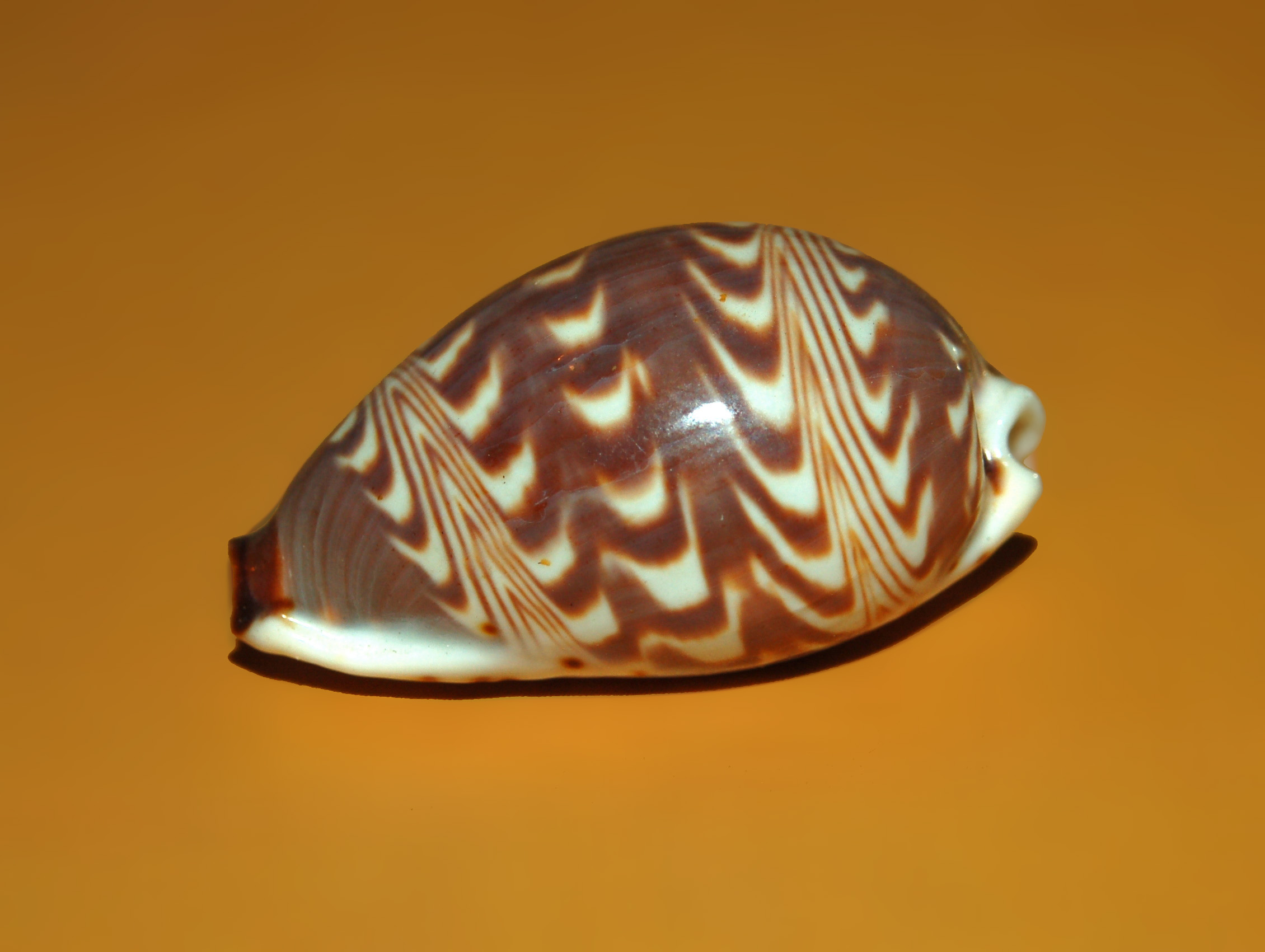
Palmadusta diluculum, anterior end towards the left

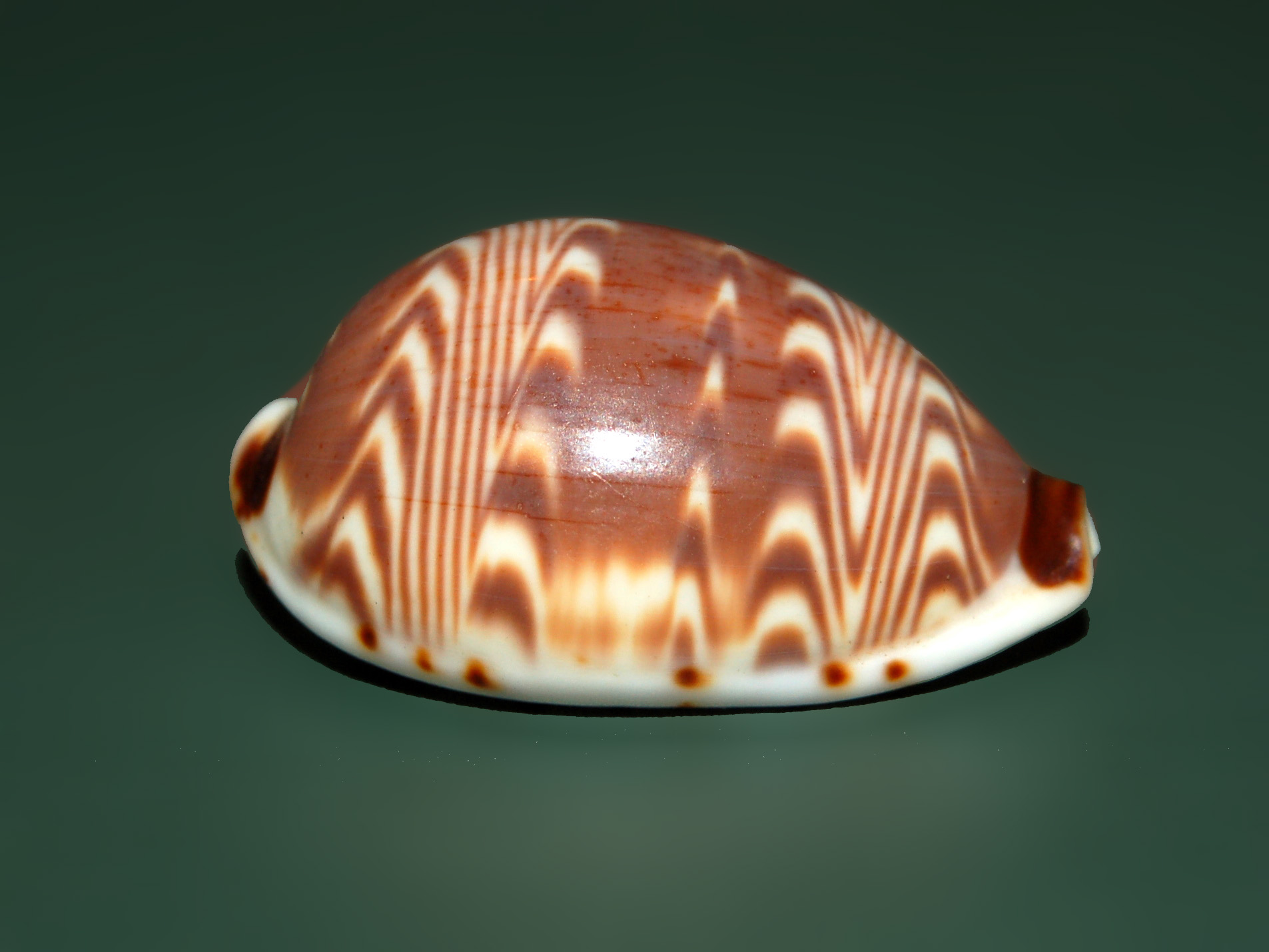
Palmadusta diluculum, anterior end towards the right

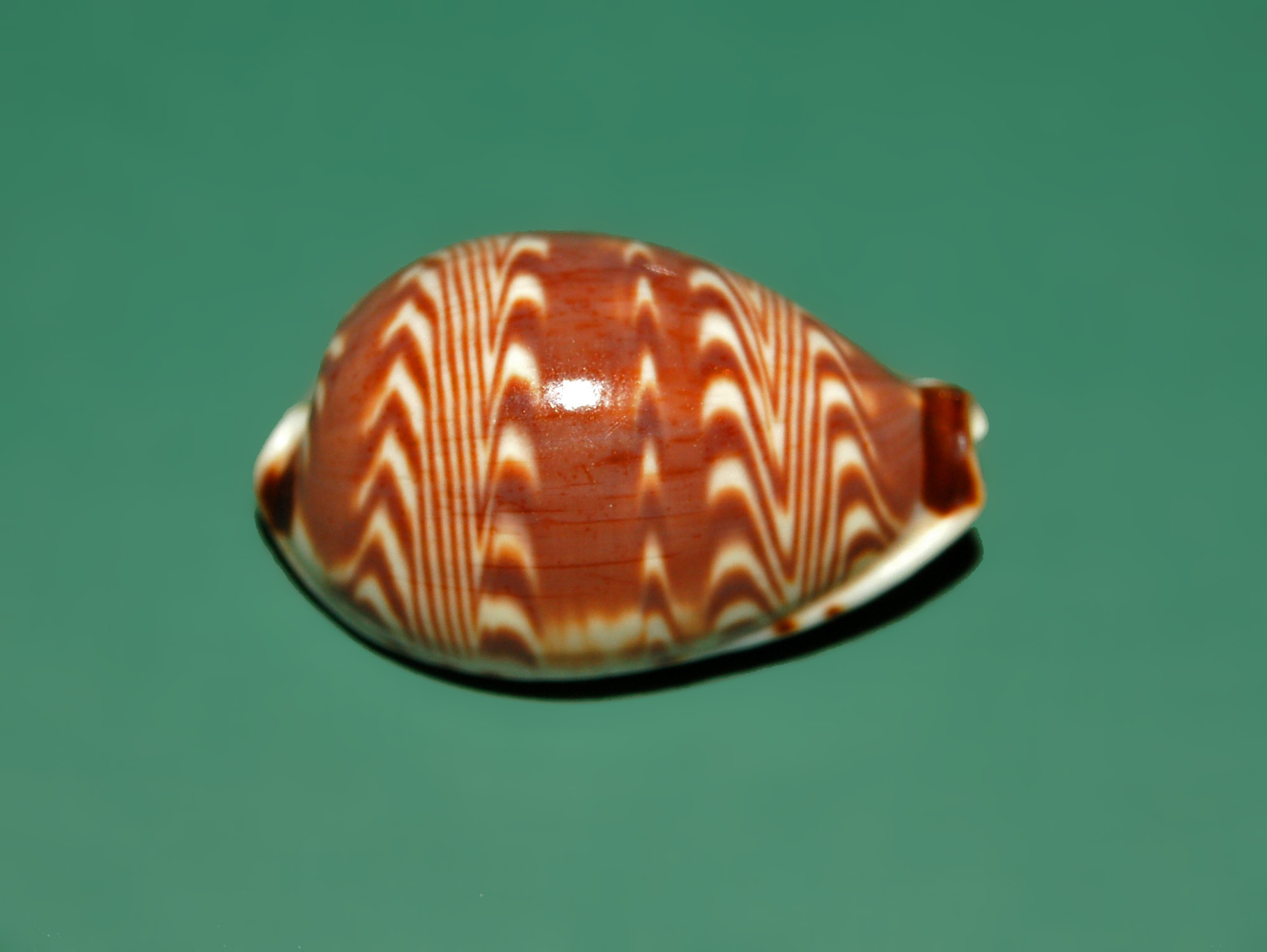
Palmadusta diluculum, dorsal view

== Distribution ==
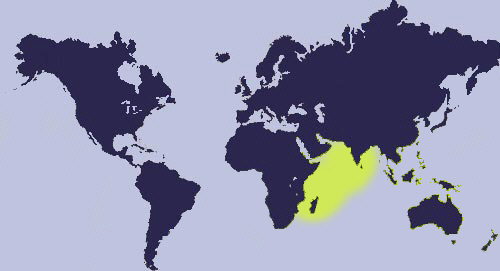
Distribution map of Palmadusta diluculum

This species is widespread throughout the Western Indian Ocean along Sri Lanka, Aldabra, Eritrea, Kenya, Madagascar, the Mascarene Basin, Mauritius, Mozambique, Réunion, the Seychelles, Somalia and Tanzania.

== Habitat ==
This demersal tropical cowry can be found in the intertidal shallow waters in sandy to muddy areas, under stones and blocks of dead coral.

== Subspecies ==
- Palmadusta diluculum diluculum Reeve, 1845
- Palmadusta diluculum virginalis Schilder & Schilder 1938
