= Palmadusta androyensis consanguinea =

Scientific classification
- Kingdom: Animalia
- Phylum: Mollusca
- Class: Gastropoda
- Subclass: Caenogastropoda
- Order: Littorinimorpha
- Family: Cypraeidae
- Genus: Palmadusta
- Species: P. androyensis
- Subspecies: P. a. consanguinea

Trinomial name
- Palmadusta androyensis consanguinea Blöcher & Lorenz, 2000

Synonyms
- Palmadusta consanguinea Blöcher & Lorenz, 2000

Subspecies of gastropod

Palmadusta androyensis consanguinea is a species of sea snail, a cowry, a marine gastropod mollusk in the family Cypraeidae, the cowries.

== Description ==
The shell size varies between 15 mm and 19 mm

== Distribution ==
This subspecies is distributed in the Indian Ocean along East Africa and Madagascar
