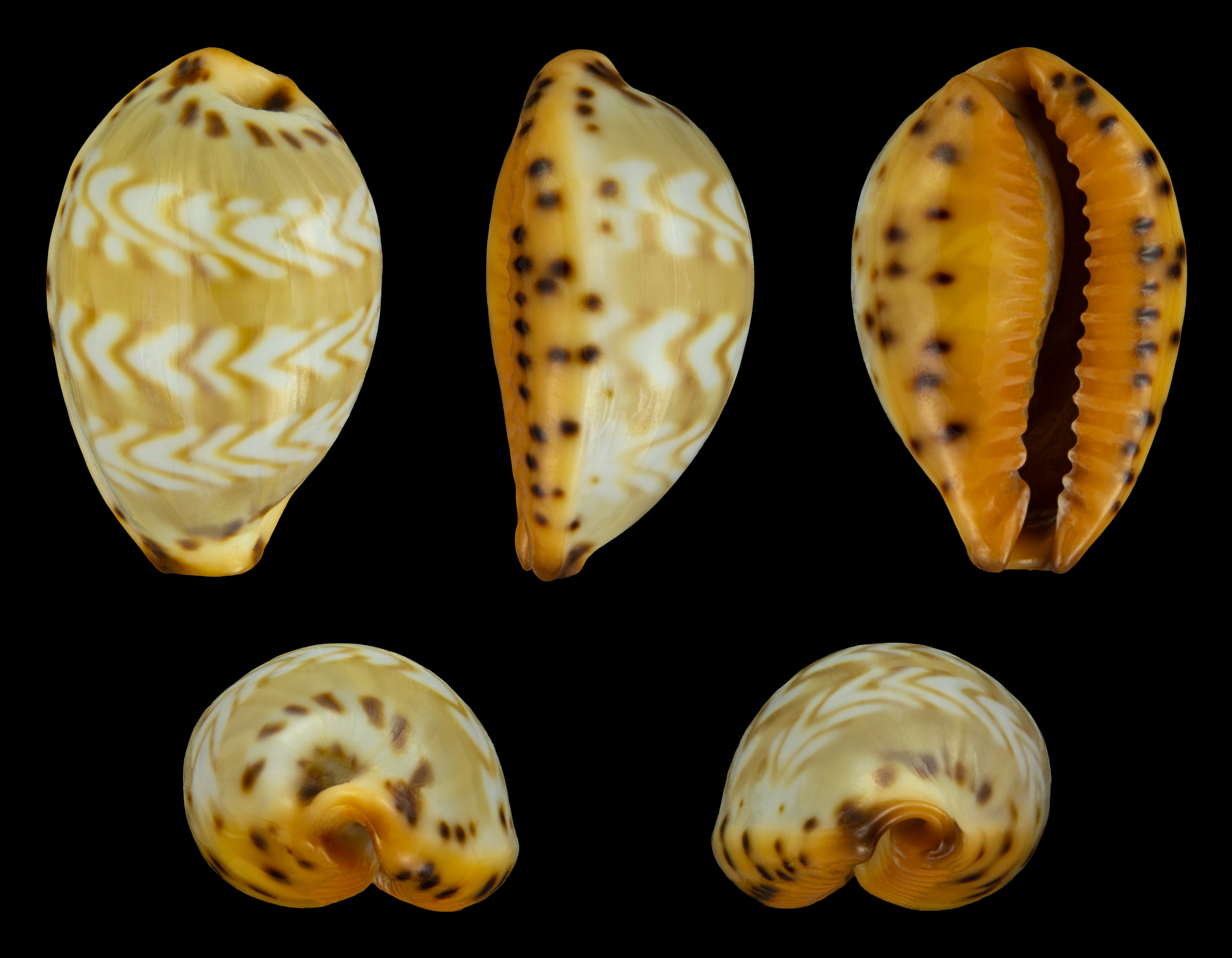

Scientific classification
- Kingdom: Animalia
- Phylum: Mollusca
- Class: Gastropoda
- Subclass: Caenogastropoda
- Order: Littorinimorpha
- Family: Cypraeidae
- Genus: Palmadusta
- Species: P. ziczac

Binomial name
- Palmadusta ziczac (Linnaeus, 1758)

Synonyms
- Cypraea ziczac Linnaeus, 1758 (basionym); Palmadusta ziczac f. undata (Lamarck, 1810); Palmadusta ziczac signata Iredale, 1939

= Palmadusta ziczac =

Species of gastropod

Palmadusta ziczac is a species of sea snail, a cowry, a marine gastropod mollusk in the family Cypraeidae, the cowries.

== Subspecies and formae ==
- Palmadusta ziczac misella (Perry, 1811)
- Palmadusta ziczac ziczac signata (f) Iredale, 1939: synonym of Palmadusta ziczac (Linnaeus, 1758)
- Palmadusta ziczac ziczac undata (f) (Linnaeus, 1758): synonym of Palmadusta ziczac (Linnaeus, 1758)
- Palmadusta ziczac vittata (Deshayes, 1831)

== Description ==
These quite common small shells reach on average 15–20 millimetres (0.59–0.79 in) of length, with a maximum size of 26 millimetres (1.0 in) and a minimum size of 8 millimetres (0.31 in). The basic color of these pyriform shells is light beige or light tan, crossed by three transversal white bands with a zigzag pattern. The base of the shell is yellow or orange-brown with some brown small spots, extended along both sides. The aperture is orange with several short teeth. In the living cowries the mantle is orange-red, with white papillae.

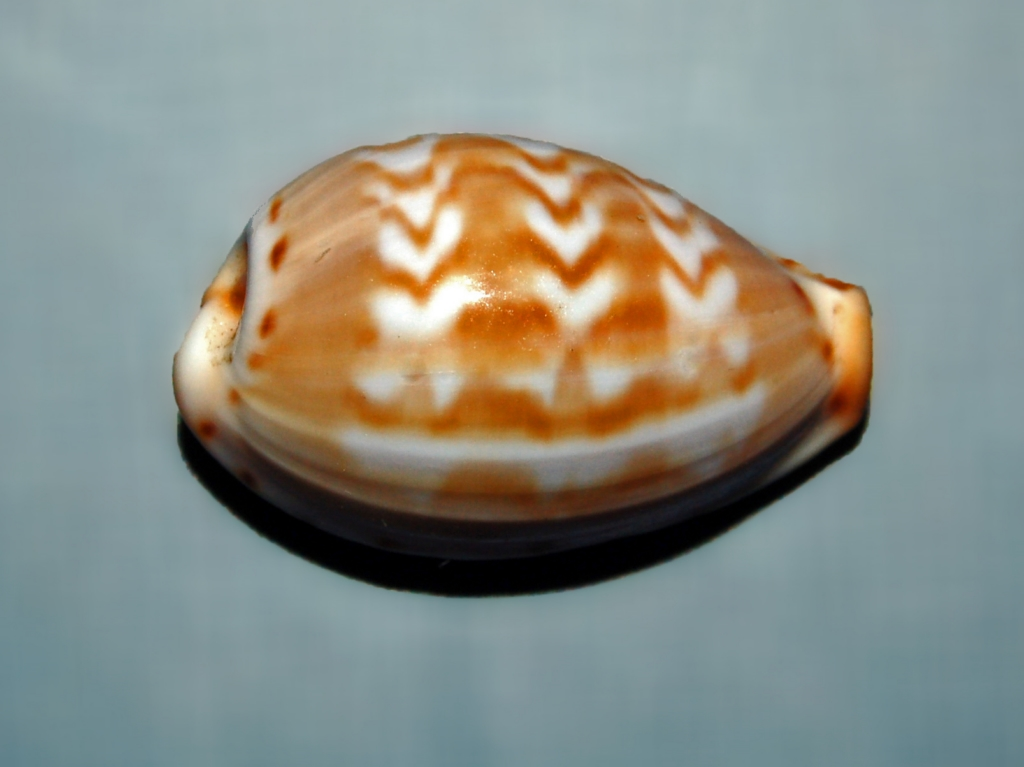
A shell of Palmadusta ziczac, dorsal view, anterior end towards the right

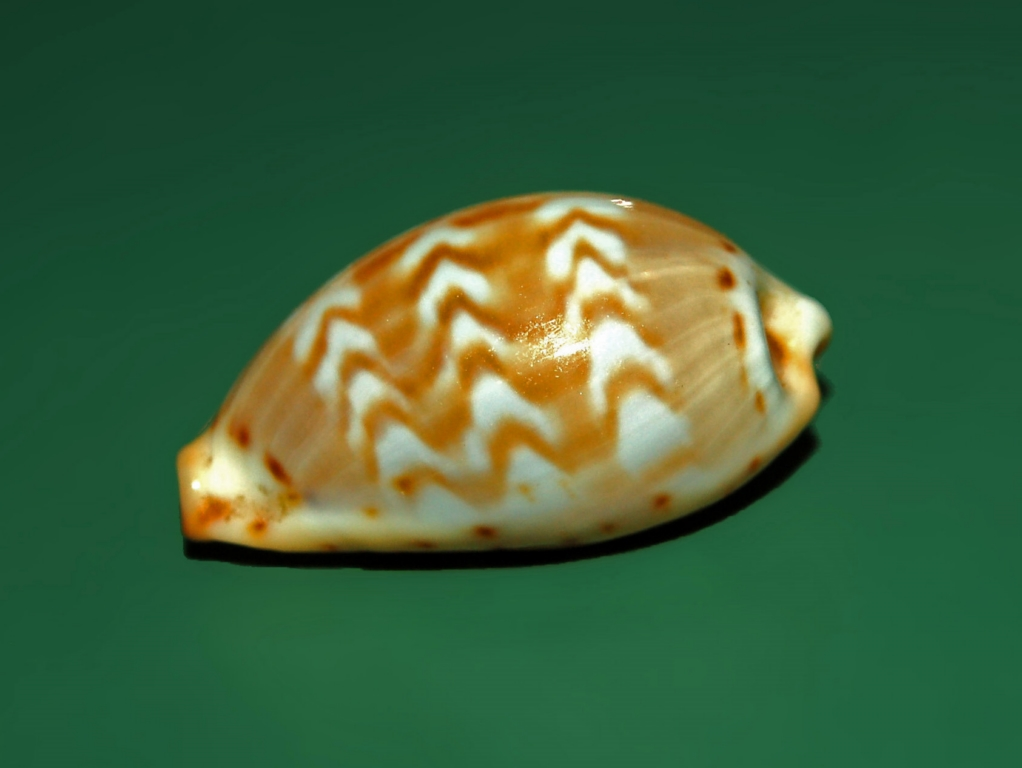
Palmadusta ziczac, lateral view, anterior end towards the left

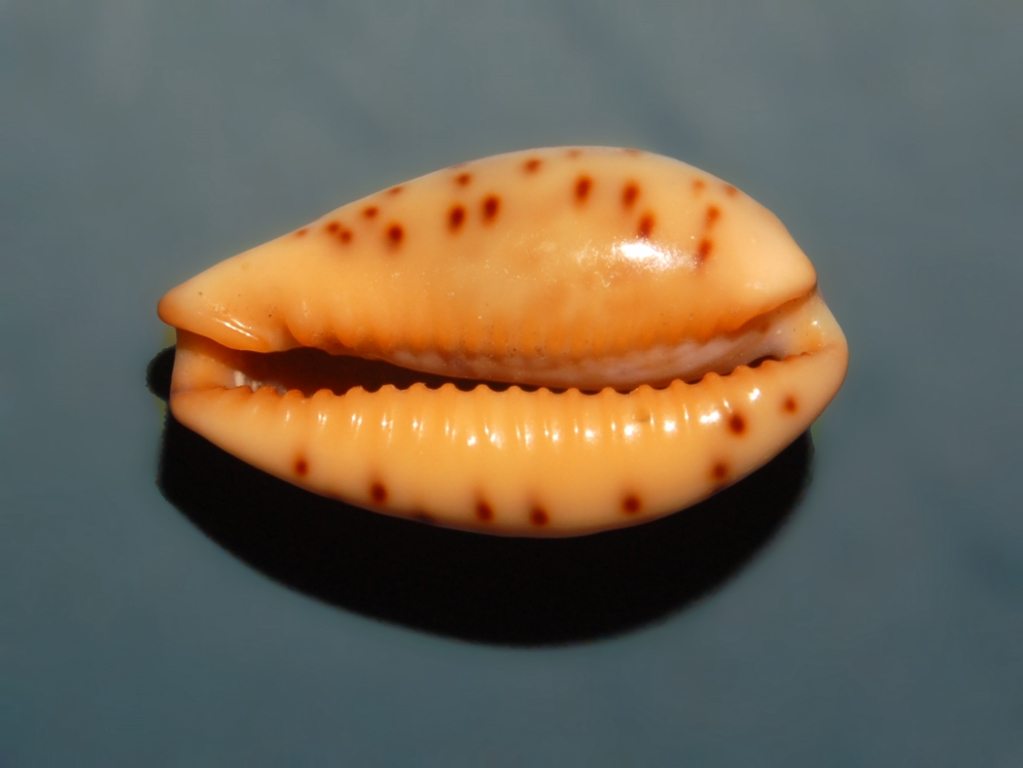
Palmadusta ziczac, apertural view, anterior end towards the left

== Distribution ==
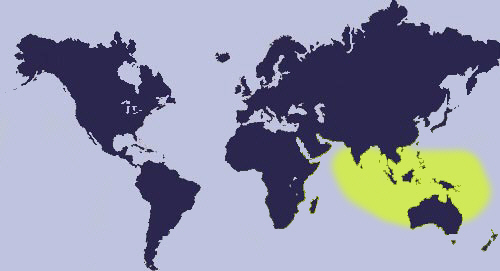
Distribution map of Palmadusta ziczac

This species is distributed in the Red Sea and in the Indian Ocean along Aldabra, Maldives, Chagos, the Comores, the East Coast of South Africa, Kenya, Madagascar, the Mascarene Basin, Mauritius, Mozambique, Réunion, the Seychelles, Somalia, and Tanzania and in the western Pacific Ocean along Melanesia, Bali, Philippines, Australia and Polynesia, except Hawaii.

== Habitat ==
These cowries live in intertidal waters up to 5–20 metres (16–66 ft) of depth, in sandy lagoons and on coral reef, usually hiding under coral and rocks.
