= Palmadusta asellus =

Scientific classification
- Kingdom: Animalia
- Phylum: Mollusca
- Class: Gastropoda
- Subclass: Caenogastropoda
- Order: Littorinimorpha
- Family: Cypraeidae
- Genus: Palmadusta
- Species: P. asellus

Binomial name
- Palmadusta asellus (Linnaeus, 1758)

Subspecies
- See text

Synonyms
- Cypraea asellus Linnaeus, 1758 (basionym)

Species of gastropod

Palmadusta asellus is a species of sea snail, a cowry, a marine gastropod mollusk in the family Cypraeidae, the cowries.

== Description ==
Palmadusta asellus has a shell reaching a length of about 2.8 centimetres (1.1 in). The shells are white with three large brown transversal bands on the upper surface. The brown mantle shows several whitish spots. In the living cowry it covers almost entirely the shells.

== Subspecies ==
Palmadusta asellus is divided into the following subspecies:

- Palmadusta asellus asellus (Linnaeus, 1758)
- Palmadusta asellus bitaeniata (Geret, 1903)
- Palmadusta asellus latefasciata Schilder, 1930
- Palmadusta asellus vespacea (Melvill, 1905)

== Distribution ==
This species is distributed in the seas along Aldabra, Chagos, the Comores, Kenya, Madagascar, Mauritius, Mozambique, the Red Sea, Réunion, the Seychelles and Tanzania.
