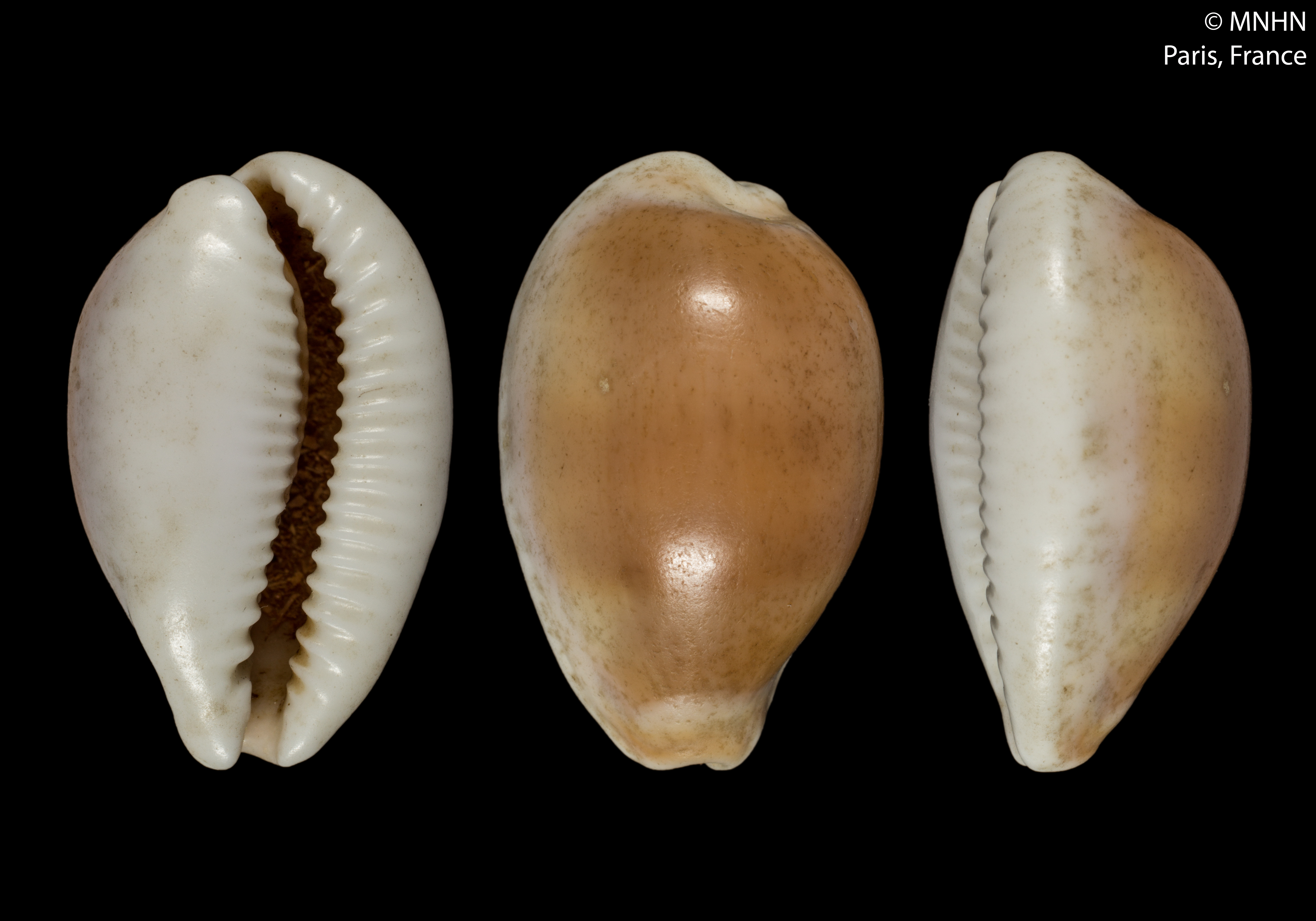
- Shell of Palmadusta artuffeli (syntype at MNHN, Paris)

Scientific classification
- Kingdom: Animalia
- Phylum: Mollusca
- Class: Gastropoda
- Subclass: Caenogastropoda
- Order: Littorinimorpha
- Family: Cypraeidae
- Genus: Palmadusta
- Species: P. artuffeli

Binomial name
- Palmadusta artuffeli (Jousseaume, 1876)

Synonyms
- Cypraea artuffeli Jousseaume, 1876

= Palmadusta artuffeli =

Species of gastropod

Palmadusta artuffeli is a species of sea snail, a cowry, a marine gastropod mollusk in the family Cypraeidae, the cowries.
