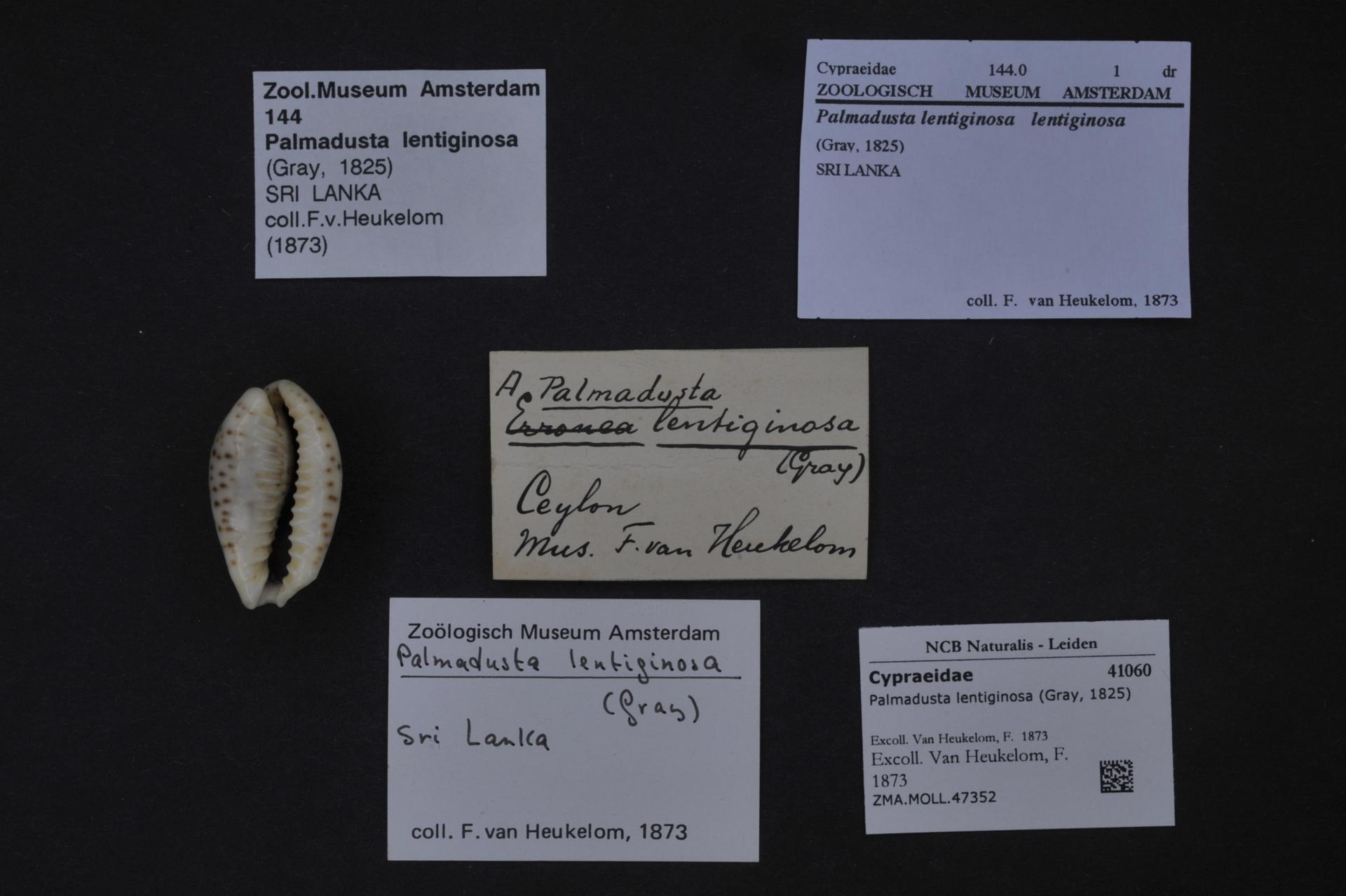

Scientific classification
- Kingdom: Animalia
- Phylum: Mollusca
- Class: Gastropoda
- Subclass: Caenogastropoda
- Order: Littorinimorpha
- Family: Cypraeidae
- Genus: Palmadusta
- Species: P. lentiginosa

Binomial name
- Palmadusta lentiginosa (Gray, 1825)

Synonyms
- Cypraea lentiginosa (Gray, 1825)

= Palmadusta lentiginosa =

Species of gastropod

Palmadusta lentiginosa is a species of sea snail, a cowry, a marine gastropod mollusk in the family Cypraeidae, the cowries.

Subspecies

- Palmadusta lentiginosa buhariensis (Jonklaas & Nicolay, 1977) (taxon inquirendum)
- Palmadusta lentiginosa dancalica (Jonklaas & Nicolay, 1977) (taxon inquirendum)

== Distribution ==
This species occurs in the Red Sea.
