= Palmadusta saulae =

Scientific classification
- Kingdom: Animalia
- Phylum: Mollusca
- Class: Gastropoda
- Subclass: Caenogastropoda
- Order: Littorinimorpha
- Family: Cypraeidae
- Genus: Palmadusta
- Species: P. saulae

Binomial name
- Palmadusta saulae (Gaskoin, 1843)

Synonyms
- Cypraea saulae Gaskoin, 1843; Palmadusta (Palmadusta) pseudolutea X.-T. Ma, 1997; Palmadusta pseudolutea X.-T. Ma, 1997; Palmadusta saulae saulae (Gaskoin, 1843) accepted, alternate representation

Species of gastropod

Palmadusta saulae is a species of sea snail, a cowry, a marine gastropod mollusk in the family Cypraeidae, the cowries.

== Description ==
This species has variable attractive dorsal patterns.

== Distribution ==
Philippines.
