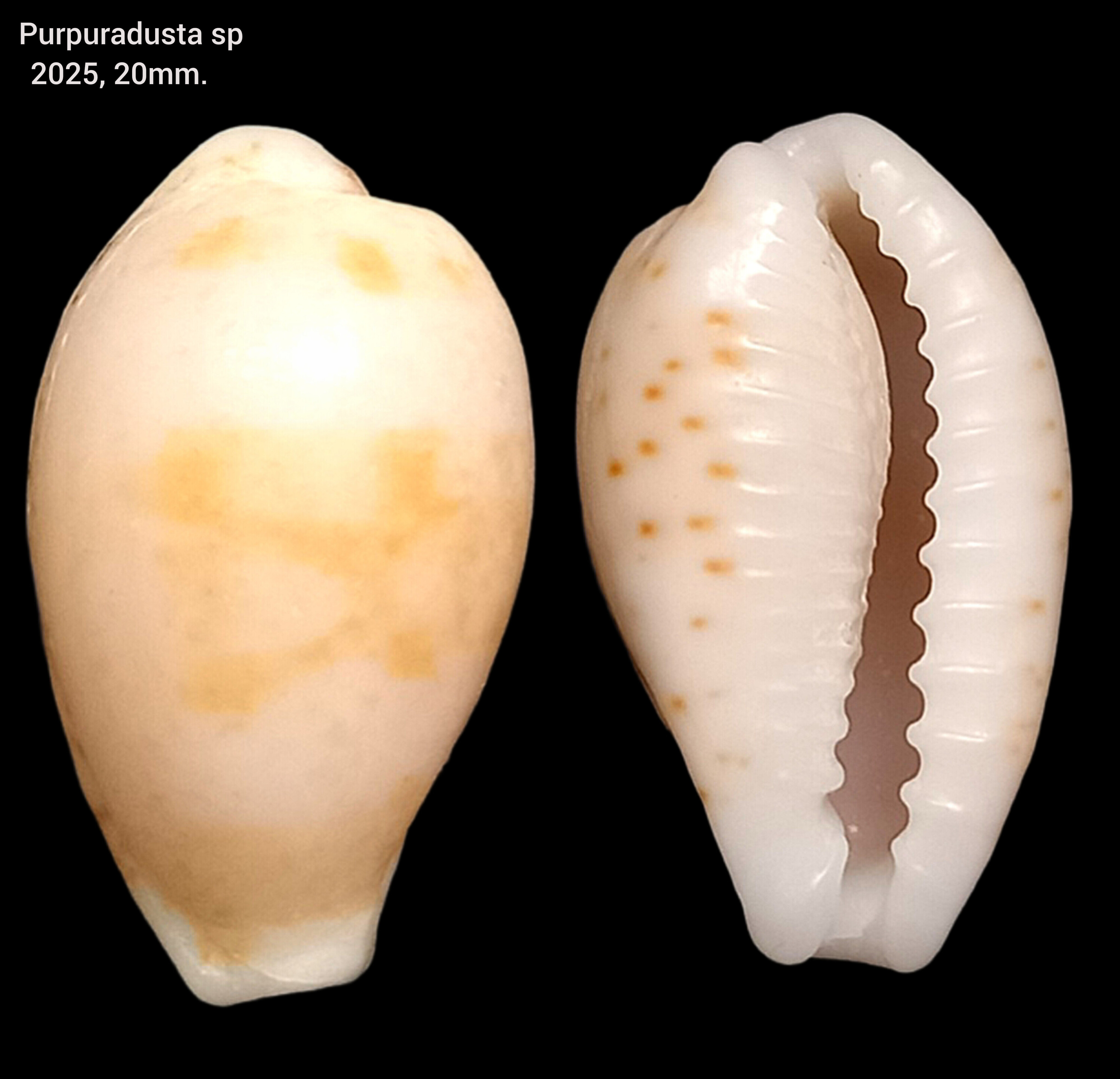
- Purpuradusta

Scientific classification
- Kingdom: Animalia
- Phylum: Mollusca
- Class: Gastropoda
- Subclass: Caenogastropoda
- Order: Littorinimorpha
- Family: Cypraeidae
- Genus: Purpuradusta; Schilder, 1939

Type species
- Cypraea fimbriata Gmelin, 1791

Synonyms
- Cupinota Iredale, 1939 · unaccepted (nomen nudum); Cypraea (Purpuradusta) Schilder, 1939 · unaccepted; Opponaria Iredale, 1939 · unaccepted (nomen nudum); Palmadusta (Purpuradusta) Schilder, 1939 · unaccepted

= Purpuradusta =

Genus of gastropods

Purpuradusta is a genus of sea snails, marine gastropod mollusks in the subfamily Erroneinae of the family Cypraeidae, the cowries.

== Species ==
Species within the genus Purpuradusta include:

- Purpuradusta barbieri (Raybaudi Massilia, L., 1986)
- Purpuradusta fimbriata (Gmelin, 1791)
- Purpuradusta gracilis (Gaskoin, 1849)
- Purpuradusta hammondae
  - Purpuradusta hammondae hammondae (Iredale, 1939)
  - Purpuradusta hammondae raysummersi Schilder, 1960
  - Purpuradusta hammondae dampierensis Schilder, M. & W.O. Cernohorsky, 1965
- Purpuradusta lacrimalis Monterosato
- Purpuradusta microdon (Gray, 1828)
- Purpuradusta minoridens (Melvill, 1901)
- Purpuradusta oryzaeformis Lorenz & Sterba, 1999 the Rice-grain cowry
- Purpuradusta quisquiliara (Watson, 1886)
- Purpuradusta serrulifera (Schilder & M. Schilder, 1938); Synonyms:
- Purpuradusta durbanensis (Schilder & Schilder, 1938): synonym of Purpuradusta fimbriata fimbriata (Gmelin, 1791)

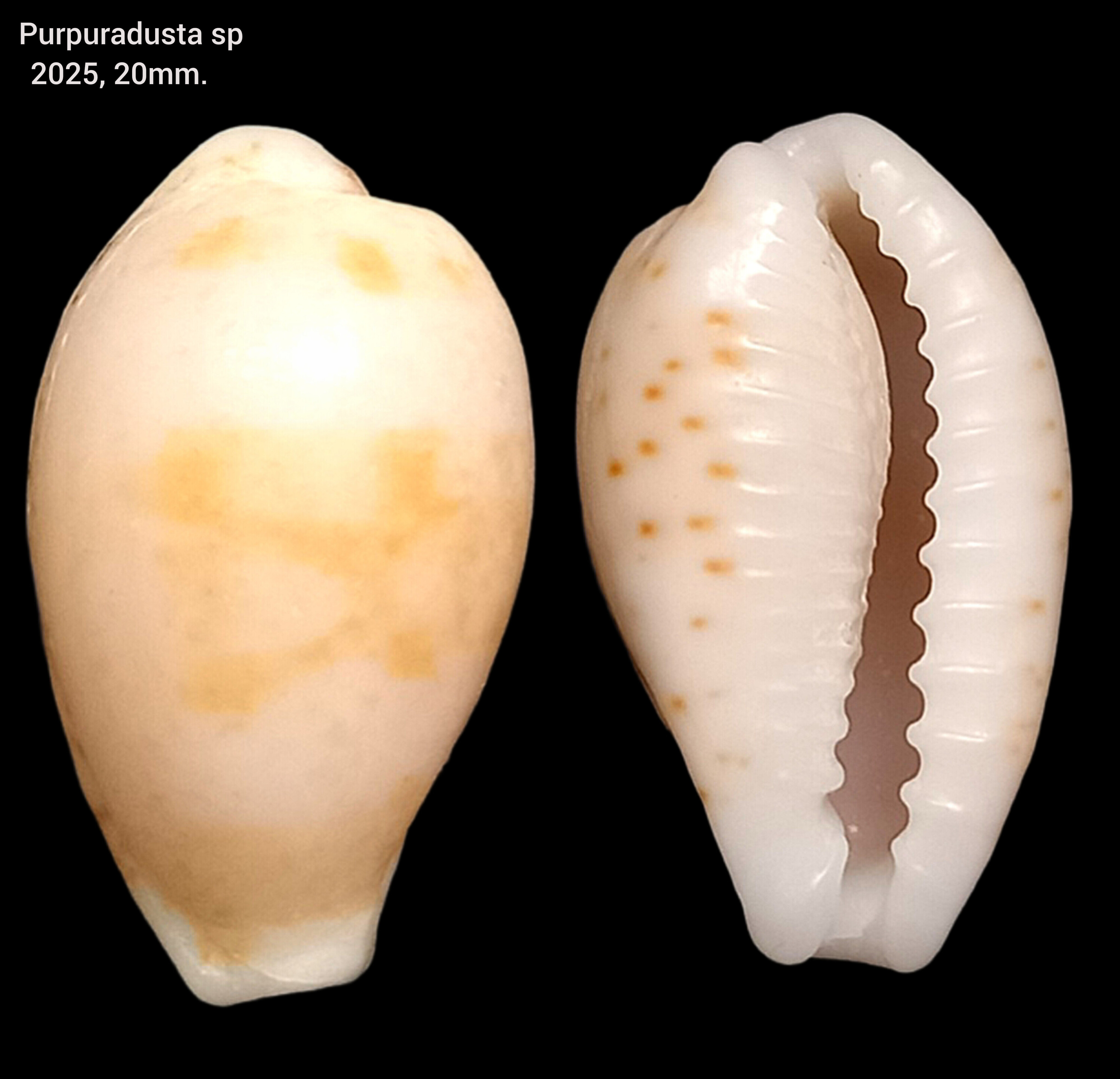
Purpuradusta
