= Purpuradusta fimbriata =

Scientific classification
- Kingdom: Animalia
- Phylum: Mollusca
- Class: Gastropoda
- Subclass: Caenogastropoda
- Order: Littorinimorpha
- Family: Cypraeidae
- Genus: Purpuradusta
- Species: P. fimbriata

Binomial name
- Purpuradusta fimbriata (Gmelin, 1791)

Synonyms
- Cypraea fimbriata Gmelin, 1791; Palmadusta fimbriata (Gmelin, 1791); Purpuradusta marmorata Schröter, 1804

Species of gastropod

Purpuradusta fimbriata (common name: fringed cowry) is a species of sea snail, a cowry, a marine gastropod mollusk in the family Cypraeidae, the cowries.

== Subspecies ==
The following subspecies are recognized:

- Purpuradusta fimbriata durbanensis (Schilder & Schilder, 1938) (synonyms : Cypraea fimbriata durbanensis (Schilder & Schilder, 1938); Palmadusta fimbriata durbanensis Schilder & Schilder, 1938)
  - forma : Purpuradusta fimbriata durbanensis quasigracilis (f) Lorenz, F. Jr., 1989
  - forma : Purpuradusta fimbriata unifasciata waikikiensis (f) Schilder, F.A., 1933
- Purpuradusta fimbriata fimbriata (Gmelin, 1791)
- Purpuradusta fimbriata marquesana Lorenz, 2002
- Purpuradusta fimbriata quasigracilis Lorenz, 1989
- Purpuradusta fimbriata unifasciata (Mighels, J.W., 1845)
- Purpuradusta fimbriata waikikiensis Schilder, 1933

== Description ==
The shell size varies between 7 mm and 21 mm.

== Distribution ==
This species and its subspecies occur in the Red Sea and in the Indian Ocean off Aldabra, Chagos, the Comores, Kenya, Madagascar, the Mascarene Basin, Mauritius, Mozambique, Réunion, the Seychelles, Somalia and Tanzania; in the Pacific Ocean off Japan.
