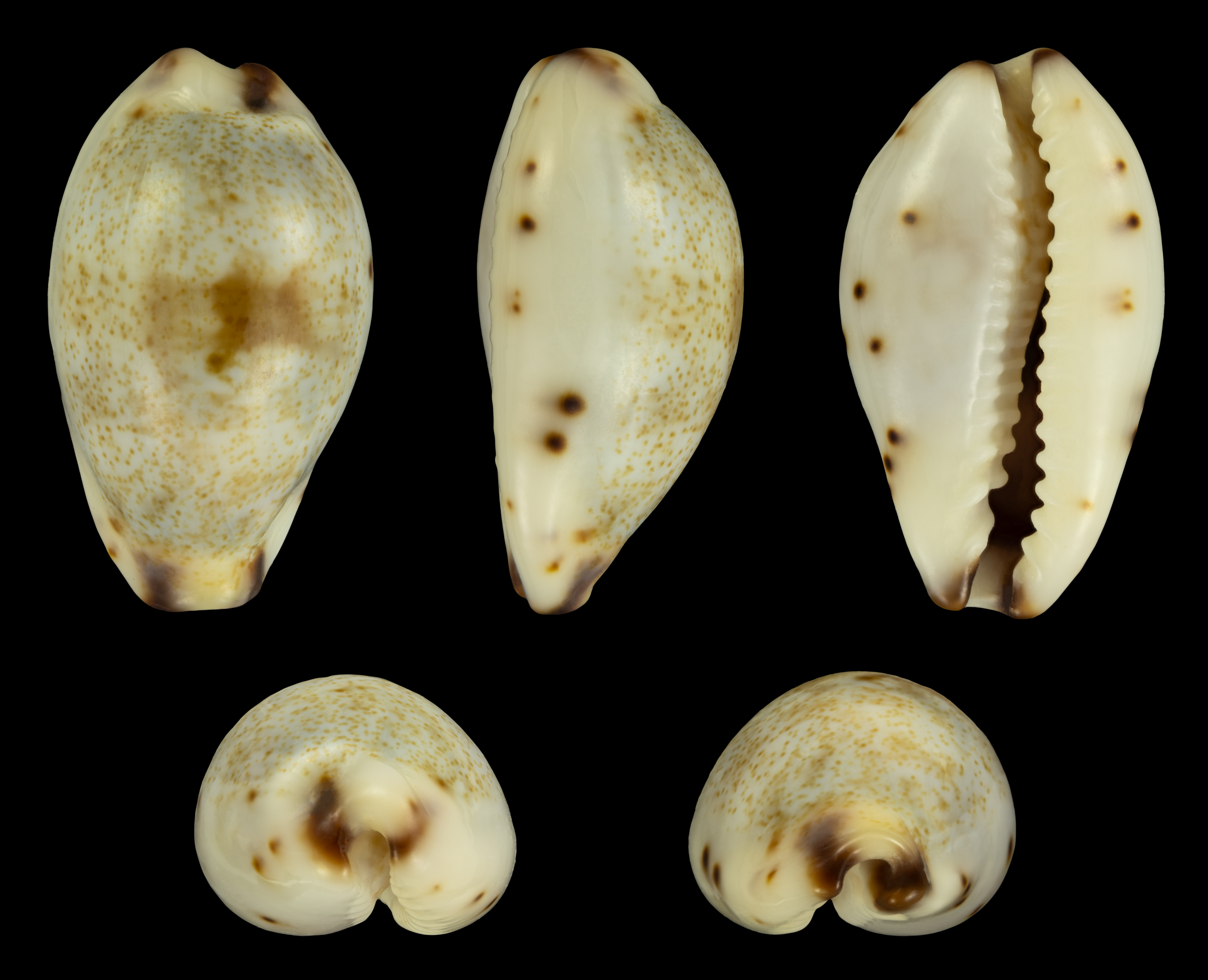

Scientific classification
- Kingdom: Animalia
- Phylum: Mollusca
- Class: Gastropoda
- Subclass: Caenogastropoda
- Order: Littorinimorpha
- Family: Cypraeidae
- Genus: Purpuradusta
- Species: P. gracilis

Binomial name
- Purpuradusta gracilis (Gaskoin, 1849)

Synonyms
- Cypraea gracilis Gaskoin, 1849; Palmadusta gracilis

= Purpuradusta gracilis =

Species of gastropod

Purpuradusta gracilis is a species of sea snail, a cowry, a marine gastropod mollusk in the family Cypraeidae, the cowries.

== Subspecies ==
- Purpuradusta gracilis gracilis (Gaskoin, J.S., 1849)
  - forma : Purpuradusta gracilis gracilis japonica (f) Schilder, F.A., 1931
- Purpuradusta gracilis jamila Lorenz, 1998
- Purpuradusta gracilis macula (Angas, G.F., 1867
  - forma : Purpuradusta gracilis macula hilda (f) Iredale, T., 1939
- Purpuradusta gracilis nemethi Van Heesvelde, J., 2010
- Purpuradusta gracilis notata (Gill, 1858)
  - forma : Purpuradusta gracilis notata jamila (f) Lorenz, F. Jr. & A. Hubert, 1993

== Description ==
The length of the shell attains 14.9 mm.

== Distribution ==
This species is distributed in the European waters and in the Indian Ocean along Aldabra, Chagos, Kenya, the Mascarene Basin, Mauritius, Réunion, the Seychelles, Somalia, South Korea and Tanzania.
