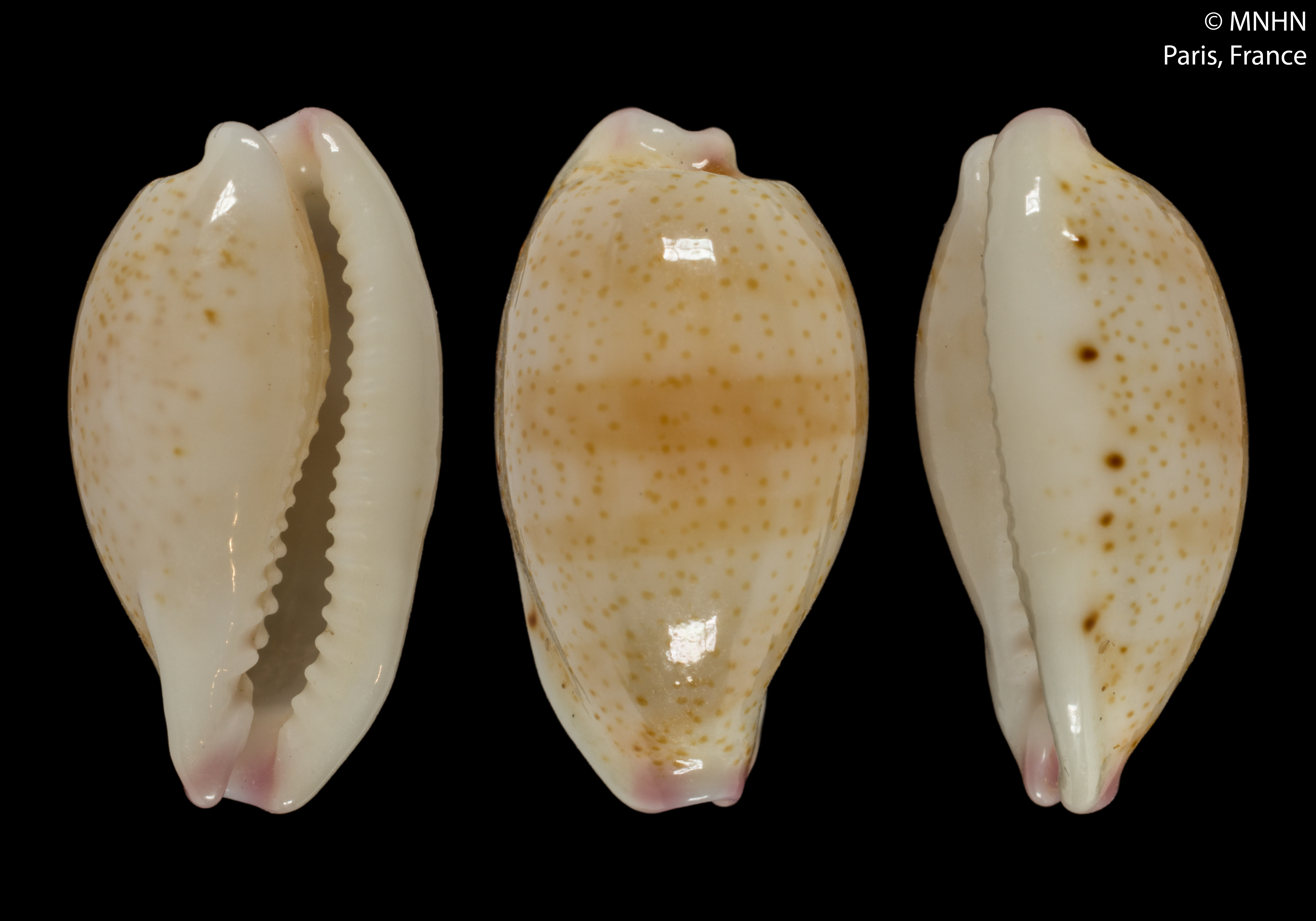
- Shell of Purpuradusta minoridens julianjosephi (holotype at MNHN, Paris)

Scientific classification
- Kingdom: Animalia
- Phylum: Mollusca
- Class: Gastropoda
- Subclass: Caenogastropoda
- Order: Littorinimorpha
- Family: Cypraeidae
- Genus: Purpuradusta
- Species: P. minoridens

Binomial name
- Purpuradusta minoridens (Melvill, 1901)

Synonyms
- Cypraea minoridens Melvill, 1901; Cypraea minoridens blandita (f) Iredale, 1939; Cypraea minoridens suvaensis (f) Steadman, W.R. & B.C. Cotton, 1943

= Purpuradusta minoridens =

Species of gastropod

Purpuradusta minoridens, common name : the small-toothed cowry, is a species of tropical sea snail, a cowry, a marine gastropod mollusk in the family Cypraeidae.

Subspecies

- Purpuradusta minoridens julianjosephi Lorenz, 2017
- Purpuradusta minoridens minoridens (Melvill, 1901)

== Description ==
The shell of this species is white in color with orange-yellow dots, and it has a reddish-purple tip.

== Distribution ==
The species is found in the Philippines, South West Pacific; Japan, Samoa and South East Africa, Papua New Guinea, Solomon Islands, Fiji, East Timor, Australia and Vanuatu.

== Bibliography ==
- Steyn, D.G. & Lussi, M. (1998) Marine Shells of South Africa. An Illustrated Collector’s Guide to Beached Shells. Ekogilde Publishers, Hartebeespoort, South Africa, ii + 264 pp. page(s): 66
