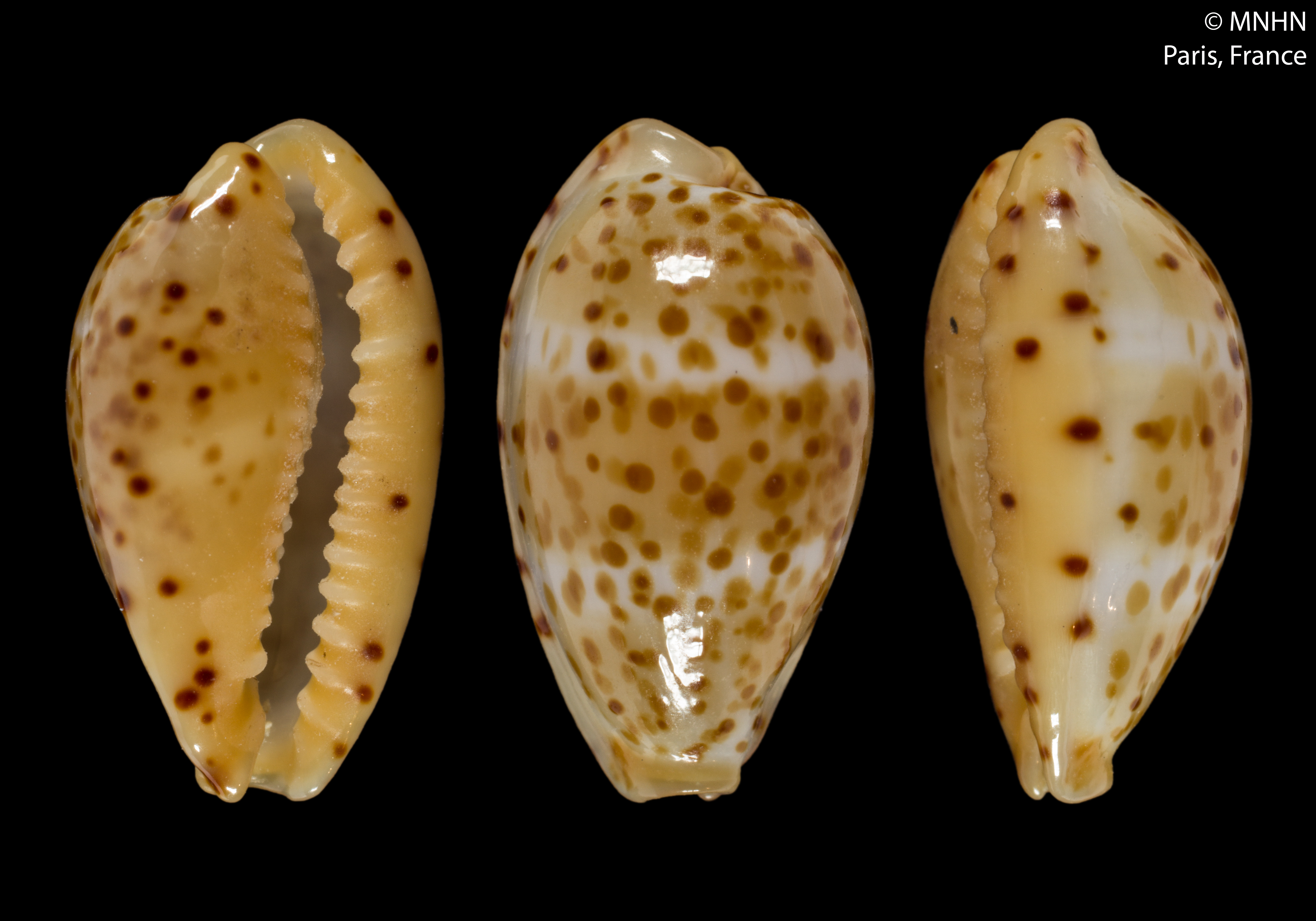
- Shell of Palmadusta johnsonorum (holotype at MNHN, Paris)

Scientific classification
- Kingdom: Animalia
- Phylum: Mollusca
- Class: Gastropoda
- Subclass: Caenogastropoda
- Order: Littorinimorpha
- Family: Cypraeidae
- Genus: Palmadusta
- Species: P. johnsonorum

Binomial name
- Palmadusta johnsonorum Lorenz, 2002

Synonyms
- Palmadusta humphreysii f. "coccinella" Lorenz and Hubert, 2000

= Palmadusta johnsonorum =

Species of gastropod

Palmadusta johnsonorum is a species of sea snail, a cowry, a marine gastropod mollusk in the family Cypraeidae, the cowries.

== Distribution ==
This marine species occurs off the Marshall Islands.
