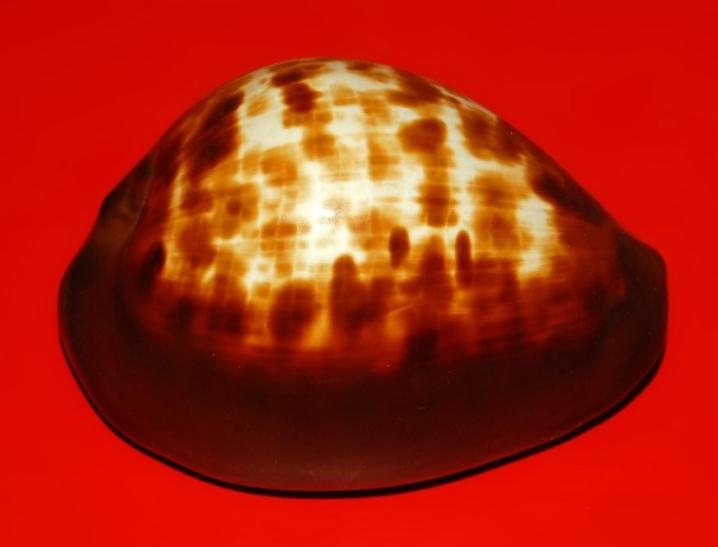
- A lateral view of a shell of Zoila decipiens from NW Australia. Anterior end towards the right.

Scientific classification
- Kingdom: Animalia
- Phylum: Mollusca
- Class: Gastropoda
- Subclass: Caenogastropoda
- Order: Littorinimorpha
- Family: Cypraeidae
- Genus: Zoila
- Species: Z. decipiens

Binomial name
- Zoila decipiens Smith, 1880

Synonyms
- Cypraea decipiens E. A. Smith, 1880

= Zoila decipiens =

Species of gastropod

Zoila decipiens, common names the "humpback cowry" or "deceptive cowry", is a species of sea snail, a cowry, a marine gastropod mollusk in the family Cypraeidae, the cowries. This shell got its Latin name decipiens, meaning deceiving, from the fact that its damaged holotype was wrongly classified as Zoila thersites.

== Description ==
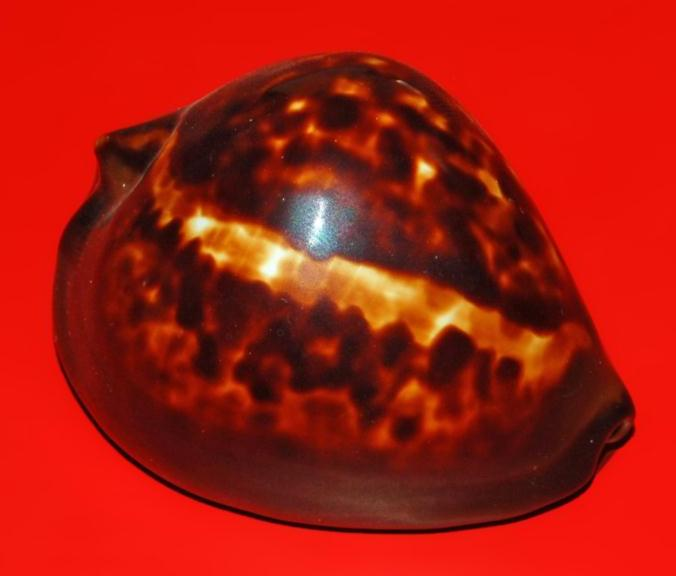
Dorsal view of Zoila decipiens

These quite uncommon snails reach about 32–70 millimetres (1.3–2.8 in) of length. The shell is rather heavy, its shape is globular, almost inflated. Dorsum is distinctly arched. Its color is pale brown and more or less densely covered with brown irregular dark brown spots, while the dorsal line is lighter and usually clearly visible. Dorsal surface is separated from the edges by a dark brown frame. The base is dark brown and almost flat, with angled edges. The mouth is narrow, the short teeth are darker than the base and are present on both lips.

== Distribution ==
This endemic species occurs in the sea along North West Australia. The shells have been most frequently found by divers from an area SW of Broome, (Australia).

== Habitat ==
These large colourful cowries live in cold deep water, feeding on sponges in crevices and rocks at a maximum depth of 60–70 metres (200–230 ft), but they are more usually found at a depth of 15–35 metres (49–115 ft).

== Subspecies ==
- Zoila decipiens decipiens Smith, 1880
- Zoila decipiens suprasinum Lorenz, 2002
