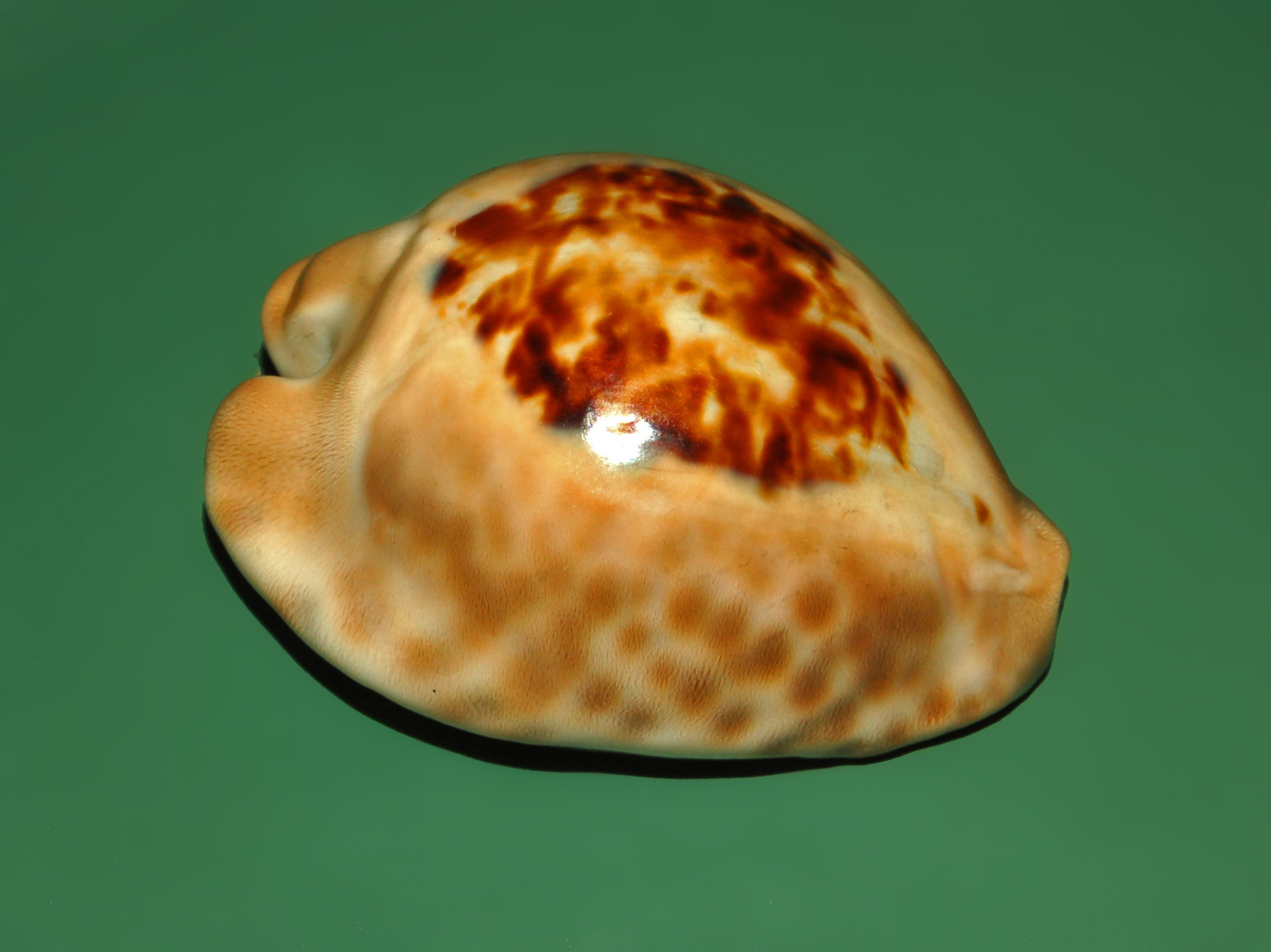
- Bernaya teulerei

Scientific classification
- Kingdom: Animalia
- Phylum: Mollusca
- Class: Gastropoda
- Subclass: Caenogastropoda
- Order: Littorinimorpha
- Family: Cypraeidae
- Genus: Bernaya; Jousseaume, 1884

= Bernaya =

Genus of gastropods

Bernaya is a genus of sea snails or cowries, marine gastropod mollusks in the family Cypraeidae, the cowries.

== Species ==
Species within the genus Bernaya include:

- Bernaya crawfordactei (extinct/fossil)
- Bernaya fultoni (Sow.): synonym of Barycypraea fultoni (Sowerby III, 1903)
- Bernaya teulerei Caz.: synonym of Barycypraea teulerei (Cazenavette, 1846)
