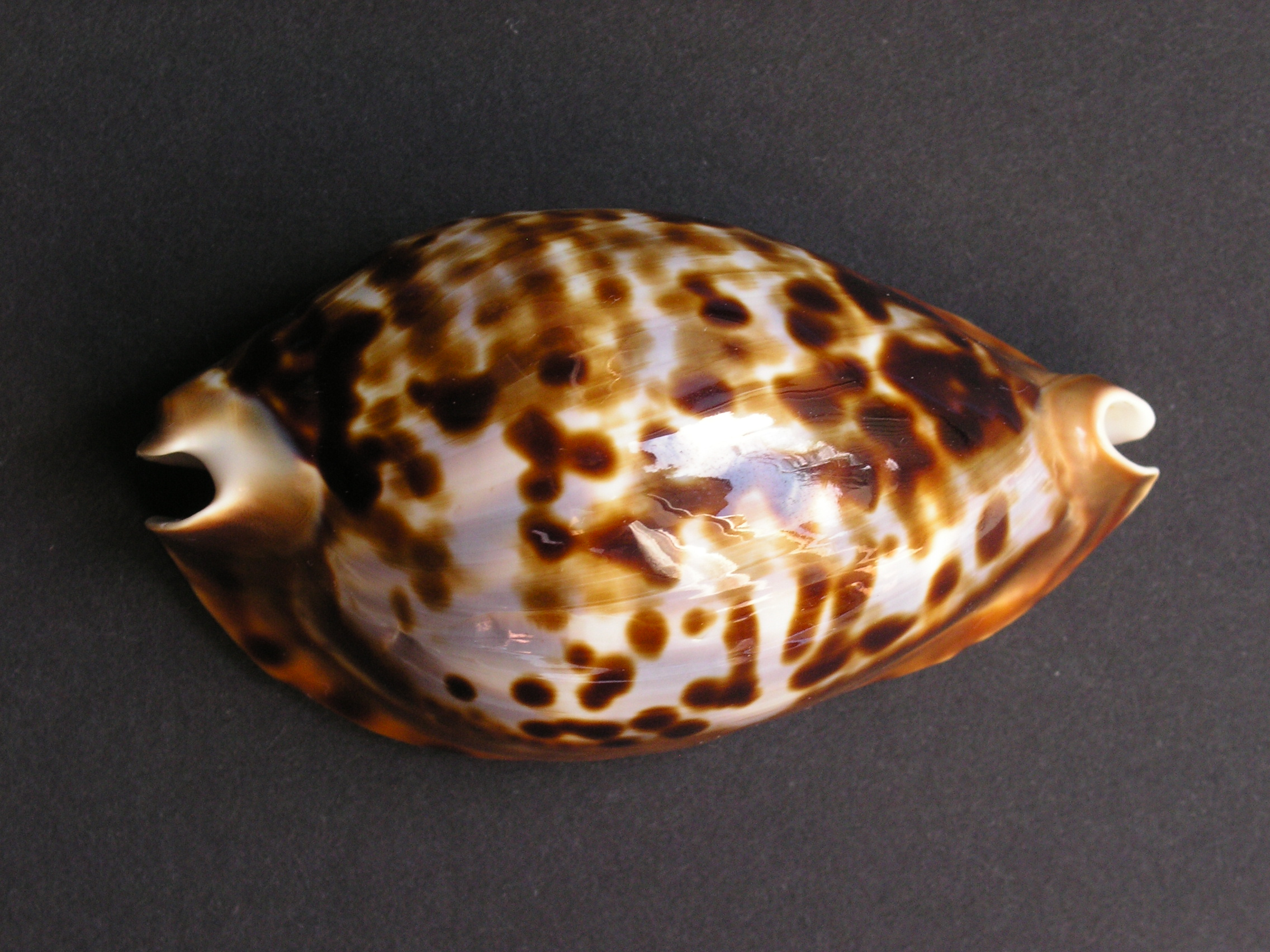
- shell of Zoila friendii

Scientific classification
- Kingdom: Animalia
- Phylum: Mollusca
- Class: Gastropoda
- Subclass: Caenogastropoda
- Order: Littorinimorpha
- Family: Cypraeidae
- Genus: Zoila; Jousseaume, 1884

Type species
- Cypraea scottii Broderip, 1831

Synonyms
- † Umbilia (Gigantocypraea) Schilder, 1927; Zoila (Zoila) Jousseaume, 1884

= Zoila =

Genus of gastropods

Zoila is a genus of sea snails, marine gastropod molluscs in the family Cypraeidae, the cowries.

== Species ==
Species within the genus Zoila include:

- Zoila alabaster Mont & Lorenz, 2013
- † Zoila campestris Darragh, 2011
- † Zoila chathamensis (Cernohorsky, 1971)
- Zoila decipiens (E.A. Smith, 1880)
- † Zoila didymorhyncha Darragh, 2011
- † Zoila dolichorhyncha Darragh, 2011
- Zoila eludens L. Raybaudi, 1991
- † Zoila fodinata Darragh, 2011
- Zoila friendii (J. E. Gray, 1831)
- † Zoila gigas (McCoy, 1867)
- † Zoila glomerabilis Darragh, 2011
- Zoila jeaniana Cate, 1968
- Zoila ketyana (L. Raybaudi, 1978)
- Zoila marginata (Gaskoin, 1849)
- Zoila mariellae L. Raybaudi, 1983
- † Zoila mulderi (Tate, 1892)
- Zoila orientalis Raybaudi, 1985
- Zoila perlae Lopez & Chiang, 1975
- † Zoila platypyga (McCoy, 1876)
- Zoila raywalkeri Lorenz, 2011
- Zoila rosselli Cotton, 1948
- Zoila thersites (Gaskoin, 1849)
- Zoila venusta (G.B. Sowerby I, 1847)
- † Zoila viathomsoni Darragh, 2011

Species brought into synonymy

- Zoila atrata Sulliotti, G.R., 1924: synonym of Mangelia decipiens E.A. Smith, 1888
- † Zoila caputavisensis Beets, 1987 : synonym of † Afrozoila caputavisensis (Beets, 1987)
- Zoila delicatura Chandler & DuRoss, 1997: synonym of Zoila eludens delicatura Chandler & DuRoss, 1997
- Zoila episema Iredale, 1939: synonym of Zoila venusta episema Iredale, 1939
- † Zoila kendengensis F. A. Schilder, 1941 : synonym of † Afrozoila kendengensis (F. A. Schilder, 1941)
- † Zoila schilderi Dey, 1941 : synonym of † Afrozoila schilderi (Dey, 1941)
