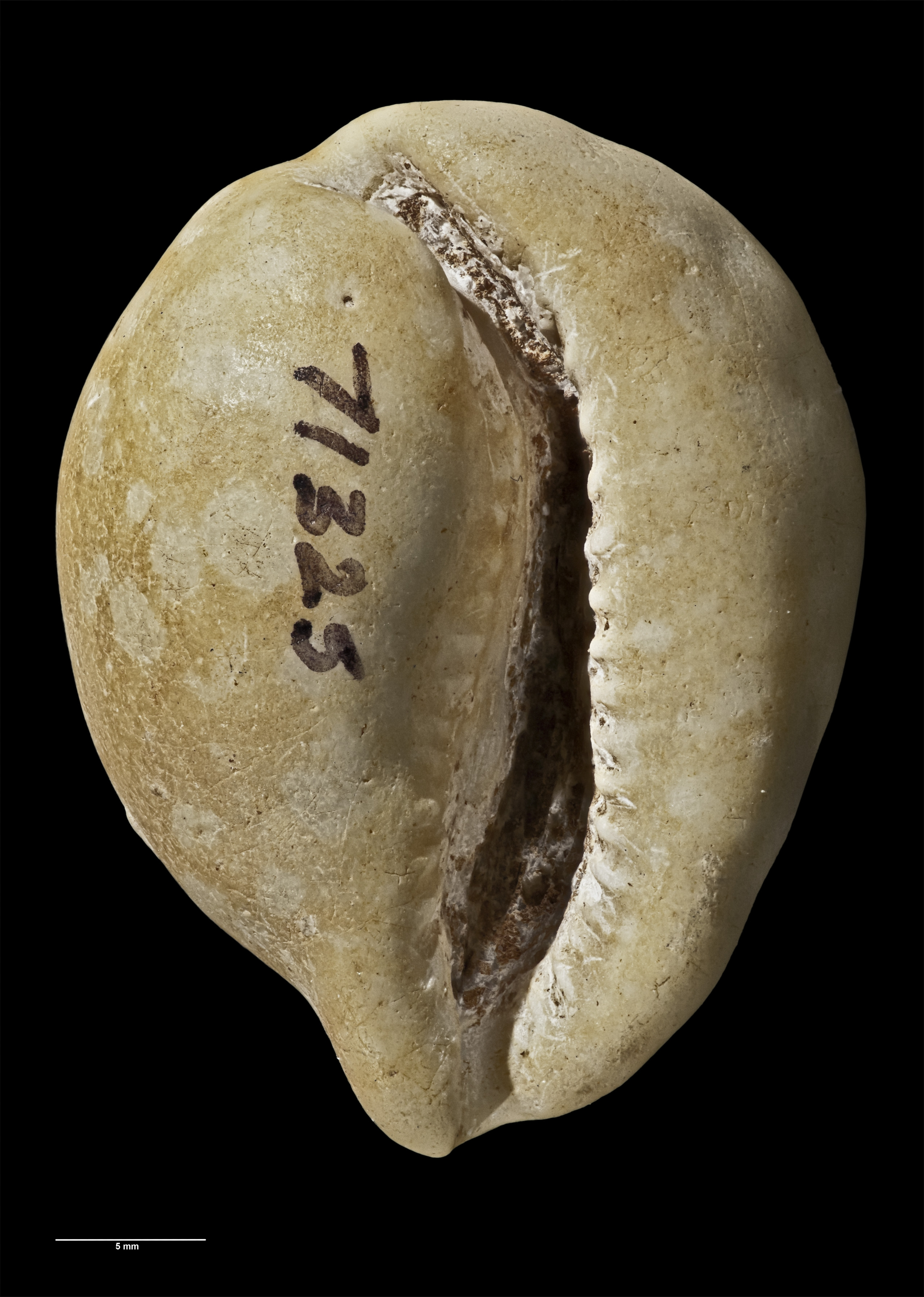
- Holotype from the Auckland War Memorial Museum

Scientific classification
- Kingdom: Animalia
- Phylum: Mollusca
- Class: Gastropoda
- Subclass: Caenogastropoda
- Order: Littorinimorpha
- Superfamily: Cypraeoidea
- Family: Cypraeidae
- Genus: Zoila
- Species: †Z. chathamensis

Binomial name
- †Zoila chathamensis (Cernohorsky, 1971) †

Synonyms
- Bernaya chathamensis Cernohorsky, 1971

= Zoila chathamensis =

Zoila chathamensis Temporal range: late Paleocene–early Eocene

Extinct species of gastropod

Zoila chathamensis is an extinct species of sea snail, a marine gastropod mollusc, in the family Cypraeidae. Known from fossils dating to the late Paleocene and early Eocene from the Chatham Islands, New Zealand, the species is the earliest known member of the genus Zoila, likely representing an ancestral form to Australian members of the genus.

== Description ==
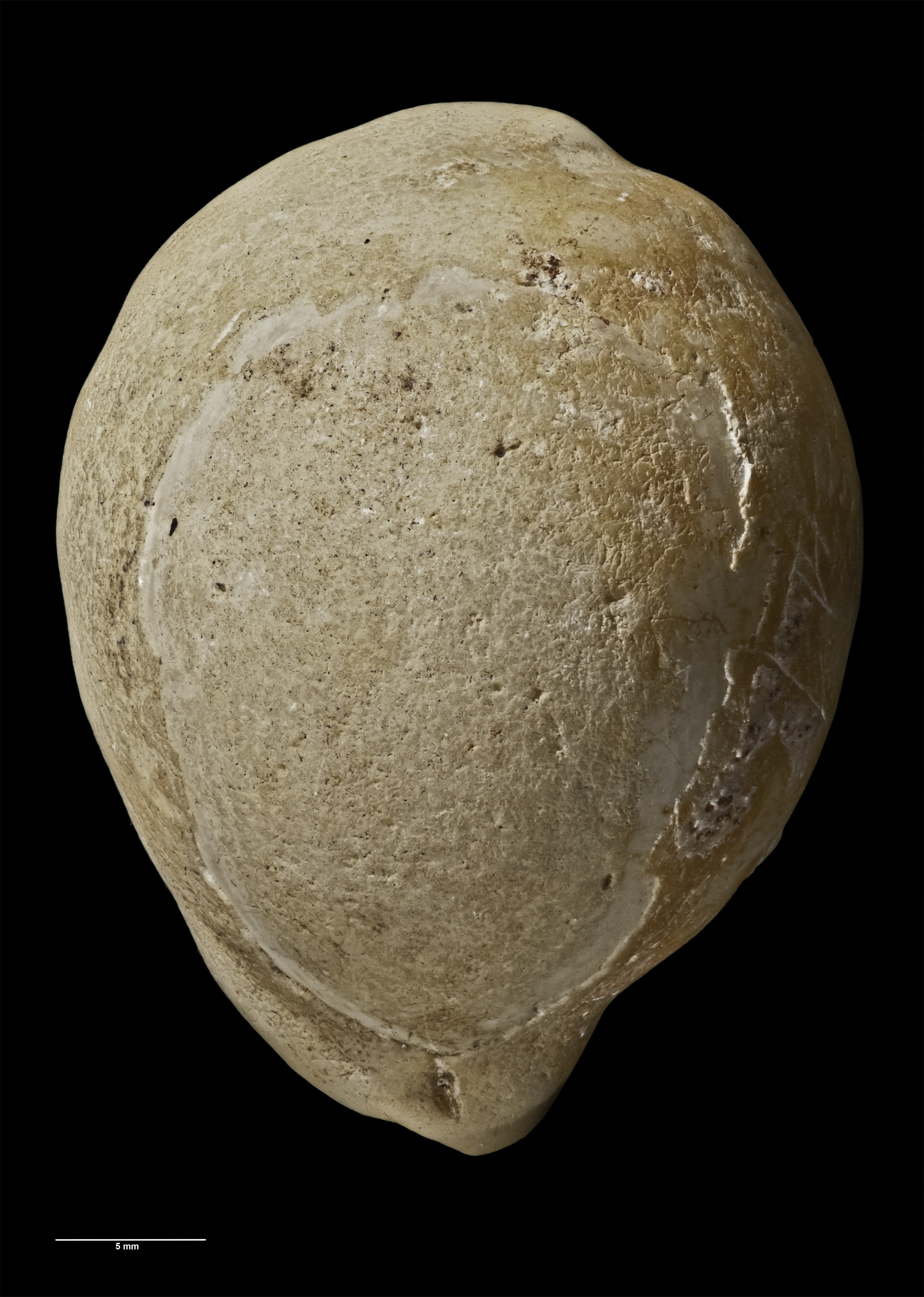
Reverse view of holotype

In the original description, Cernohorsky described the species as follows:

Shell moderate in size, 35.8 mm (1.41 in) in length, rounded and broad, posterior extremity short, anterior extremity only slightly produced, spire short and covered. Sides rounded, labial margin dimpled, base convex but concave anteriorly, labial lip moderately broad and declivious anteriorly, aperture widening anteriorly but narrow and curved posteriorly, posterior canal deep. Labial teeth slightly produced, columellar teeth short, confined to the aperture and not extending on to the columella; terminal ridge merging, columella smooth and without a sulcus, fossula broad, concave, smooth and projecting.

The holotype of the species measures 35.8 mm (1.41 in) in length, 27.3 mm (1.07 in) in width, 21.1 mm (0.83 in) in height. Specimens have between 14 and 16 teeth on their outer lips, and between 12 and 18 teeth on the columella lip. The fossula is weakly developed, and the shell ranges from slightly globose to subypriform.

It can be differentiated from Z. viathomsoni due to the fossula not being as concave.

== Taxonomy ==
The species was first described by Walter Oliver Cernohorsky in 1971, who used the name Bernaya chathamensis. In 2011 Thomas A. Darragh recombined the species, moving it to Zoila, on the basis of the species' fossula not having the deep anterior grove typical of Bernaya. The holotype was collected by A. Watherspoon at an unknown date prior to 1971, from Flower Pot Harbour, Pitt Island in the Chatham Islands. The holotype is held by the Auckland War Memorial Museum. While originally thought to originate from the Whenuataru Tuff of the Pliocene, the holotype was filled with a matrix typical of the Red Bluff Tuff. It is the earliest known fossil species from the genus Zoila, and likely represents an ancestral species to Australian Zoila.

== Distribution and habitat ==
This extinct marine species occurs in late Paleocene to early Eocene strata of the Red Bluff Tuff of the Chatham Islands, New Zealand. The species lived in the waters of the Chatham Islands at a time when the Chathams were at their warmest known temperature. Fossils are often found in association with Lamprodomina neozelanica.
