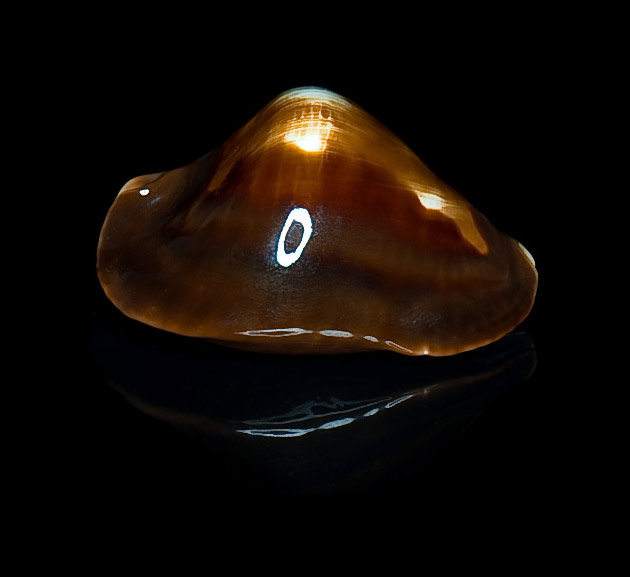

Scientific classification
- Kingdom: Animalia
- Phylum: Mollusca
- Class: Gastropoda
- Subclass: Caenogastropoda
- Order: Littorinimorpha
- Family: Cypraeidae
- Genus: Zoila
- Species: Z. rosselli

Binomial name
- Zoila rosselli Cotton, 1948

= Zoila rosselli =

Species of gastropod

Zoila rosselli is a species of sea snail, a cowry, a marine gastropod mollusk in the family Cypraeidae, the cowries.

== Distribution ==
South-western Australia.
