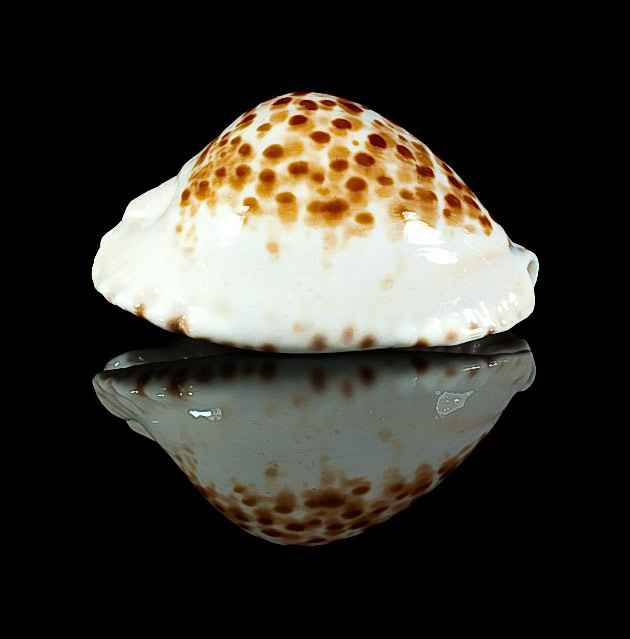

Scientific classification
- Kingdom: Animalia
- Phylum: Mollusca
- Class: Gastropoda
- Subclass: Caenogastropoda
- Order: Littorinimorpha
- Family: Cypraeidae
- Genus: Zoila
- Species: Z. orientalis

Binomial name
- Zoila orientalis Raybaudi, 1985

= Zoila orientalis =

Species of gastropod

Zoila orientalis is a species of sea snail, a cowry, a marine gastropod mollusk in the family Cypraeidae, the cowries.
