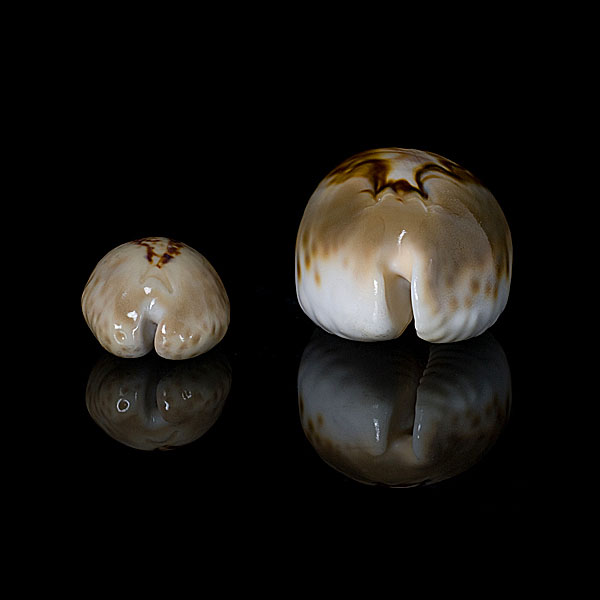
- Shells of Barycypraea fultoni (left) and Barycypraea teulerei (right)

Scientific classification
- Kingdom: Animalia
- Phylum: Mollusca
- Class: Gastropoda
- Subclass: Caenogastropoda
- Order: Littorinimorpha
- Family: Cypraeidae
- Genus: Barycypraea; Schilder, 1927

= Barycypraea =

Genus of gastropods

Barycypraea is a genus of sea snails, marine gastropod mollusks in the family Cypraeidae, the cowries.

== Species ==
Species within the genus Barycypraea include:

- †Barycypraea caputviperae Martin, 1899
- Barycypraea fultoni Sowerby III, 1903
- Barycypraea mus Linnaeus, 1758
- Barycypraea teulerei Cazanavette, B., 1846 (synonyms : Cypraea leucostoma Gaskoin, J.S., 1843; Cypraea hidalgoi Shaw, H.O.N., 1909) : synonym of Bernaya teulerei (Cazenavette, 1846)
