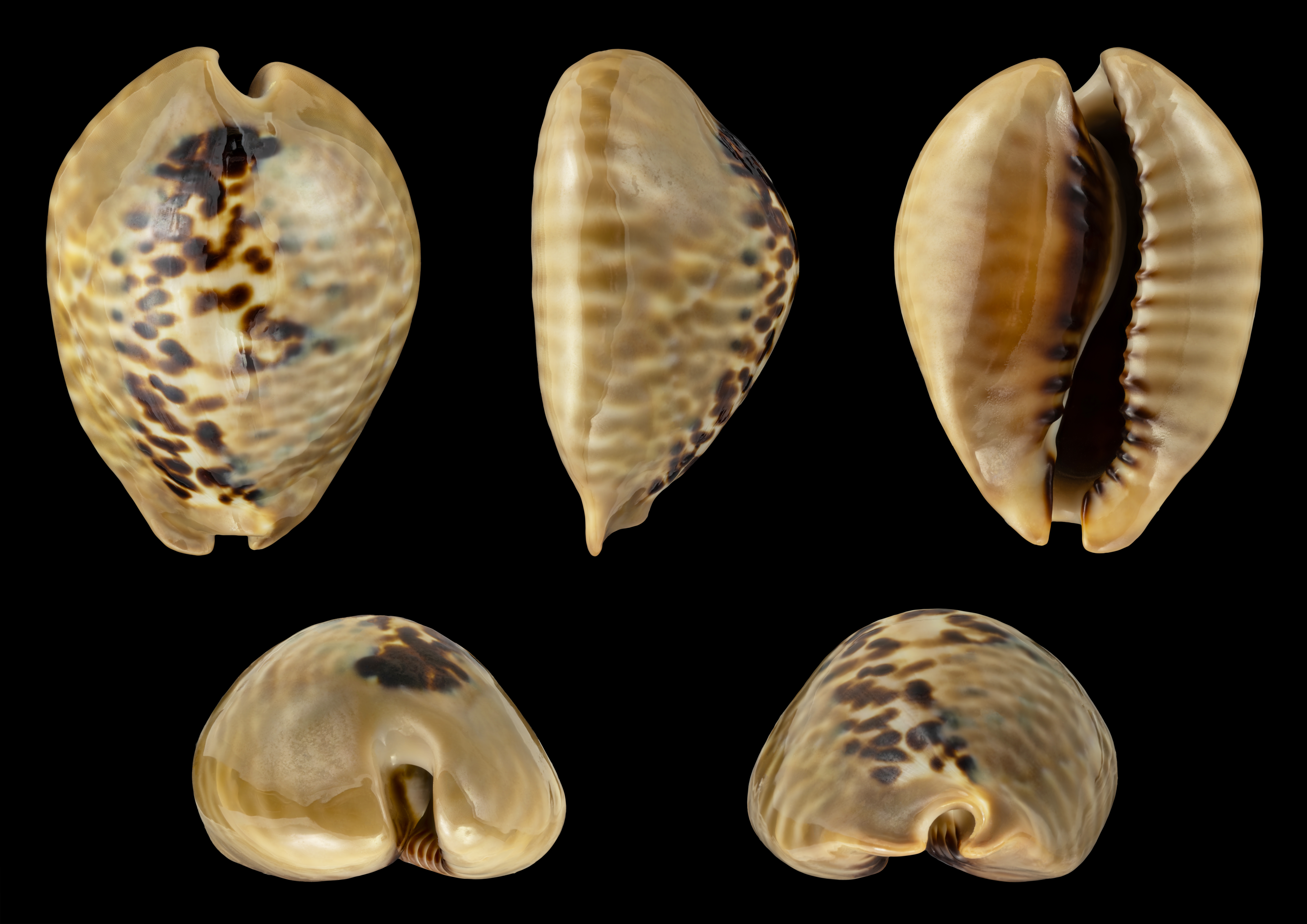
- A shell of Muracyprea mus from Amuay Bay Venezuela

Scientific classification
- Kingdom: Animalia
- Phylum: Mollusca
- Class: Gastropoda
- Subclass: Caenogastropoda
- Order: Littorinimorpha
- Family: Cypraeidae
- Genus: Muracypraea
- Species: M. mus

Binomial name
- Muracypraea mus (Linnaeus, 1758)

Synonyms
- Cypraea mus Linnaeus, 1758

= Muracypraea mus =

Species of gastropod

Muracypraea mus, common name the mouse cowry, is a species of sea snail, a cowry, a marine gastropod mollusk in the family Cypraeidae, the cowries.

This species was once considered to belong to the archaic genus Siphocypraea (which now includes only extinct species). In 2004 it was placed by Meyer in the specifically created genus Muracypraea Woodring, 1957.

== Description ==
The shells of these rare cowries reach on average 38–45 millimetres (1.5–1.8 in) of length, with a minimum size of 30 millimetres (1.2 in) and a maximum size of 67 millimetres (2.6 in). They are pyriform, quite thick and heavy, almost swollen, with slightly square contours. The dorsum surface of these smooth and shiny shells is generally pale brown or beige, with a variable pattern of dark brown spots. The base may be pale brown or whitish, the poorly developed teeth are usually white or dark brown, the aperture is long and narrow. In the living cowries mantle and foot are well developed, with external antennae. Muracypraea mus is quite similar to Bernaya teulerei.

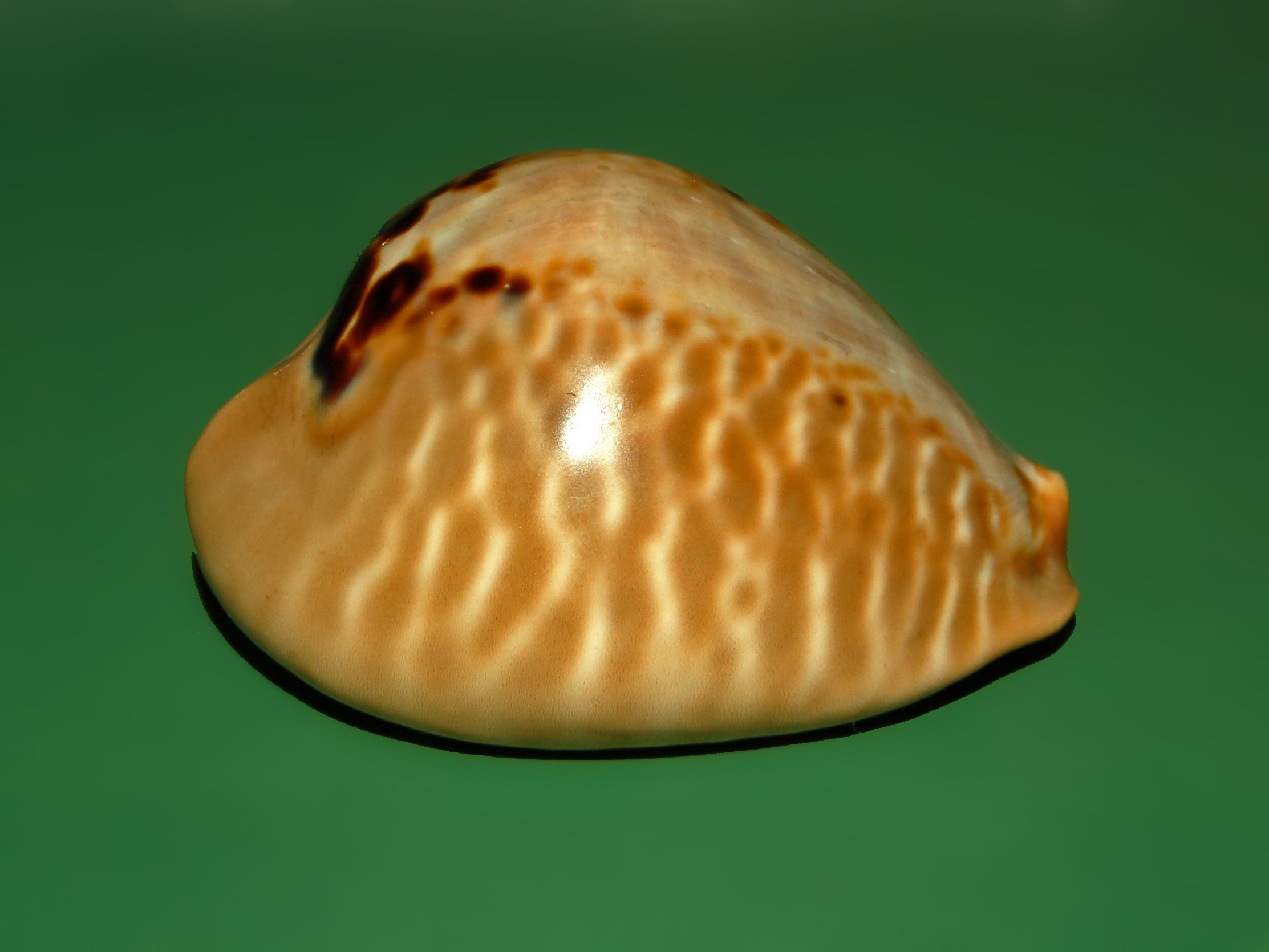
A shell of Muracyprea mus, lateral view, anterior end towards the right

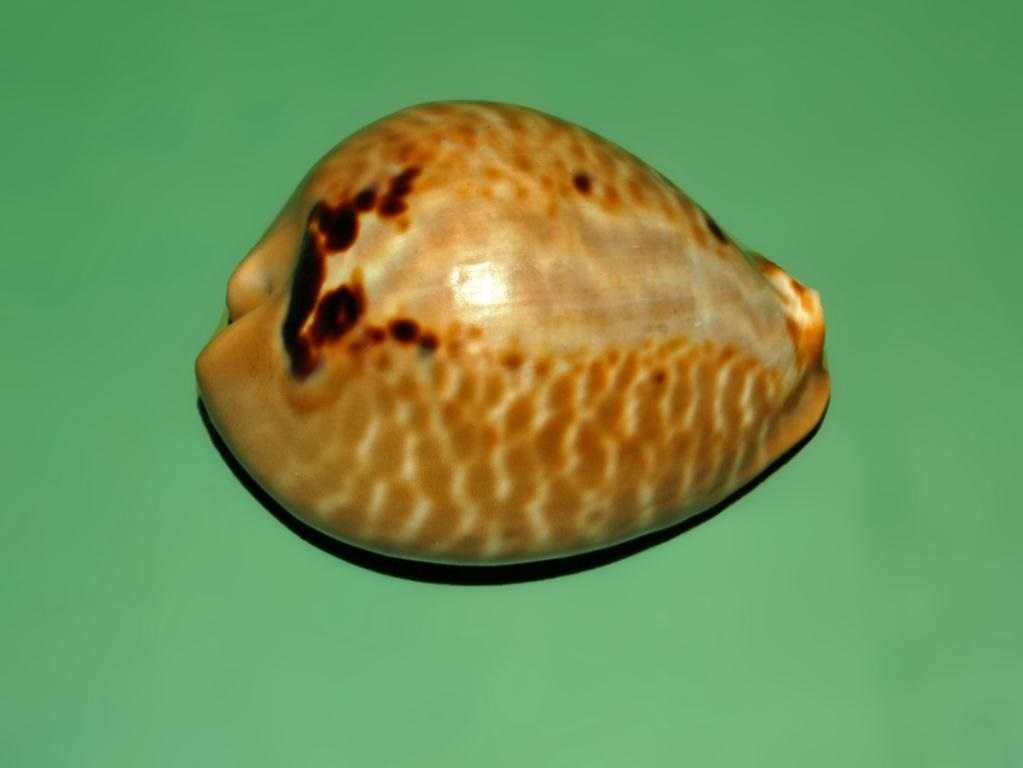
A shell of Muracyprea mus, dorsal view, anterior end towards the right

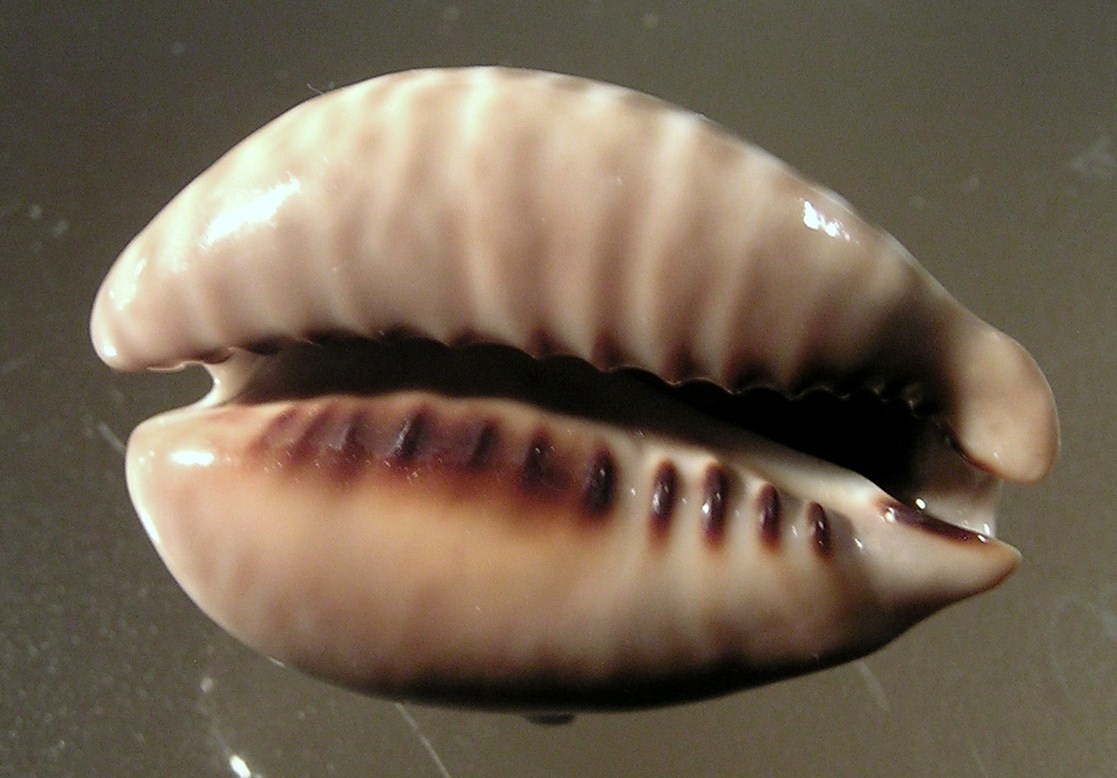
Apertural view of a shell of Muracypraea mus

== Distribution ==
Locus typicus of Cyp. mus tristensis: "Off Tucacas, Golfo de Triste, Venezuela."

These cowries live in the Southern Caribbean Sea, along northern Colombia and western Venezuela. Darker shells sometimes trawled at 100 metres. Also recently discovered at Malmok, Aruba, at a depth of 30 metres.

== Habitat ==
Muracypraea mus lives in tropical shallow water, generally in the low intertidal zone on seagrass beds, but also at greater depths, usually feeding on algae and sponges (omnivore-grazer). Minimum recorded depth is 0 m. Maximum recorded depth is 20 m.

== Subspecies ==
- Muracypraea mus bicornis Sowerby, 1870
- Muracypraea mus mus Linnaeus, 1758
- Muracypraea mus tristensis Petuch, 1987
