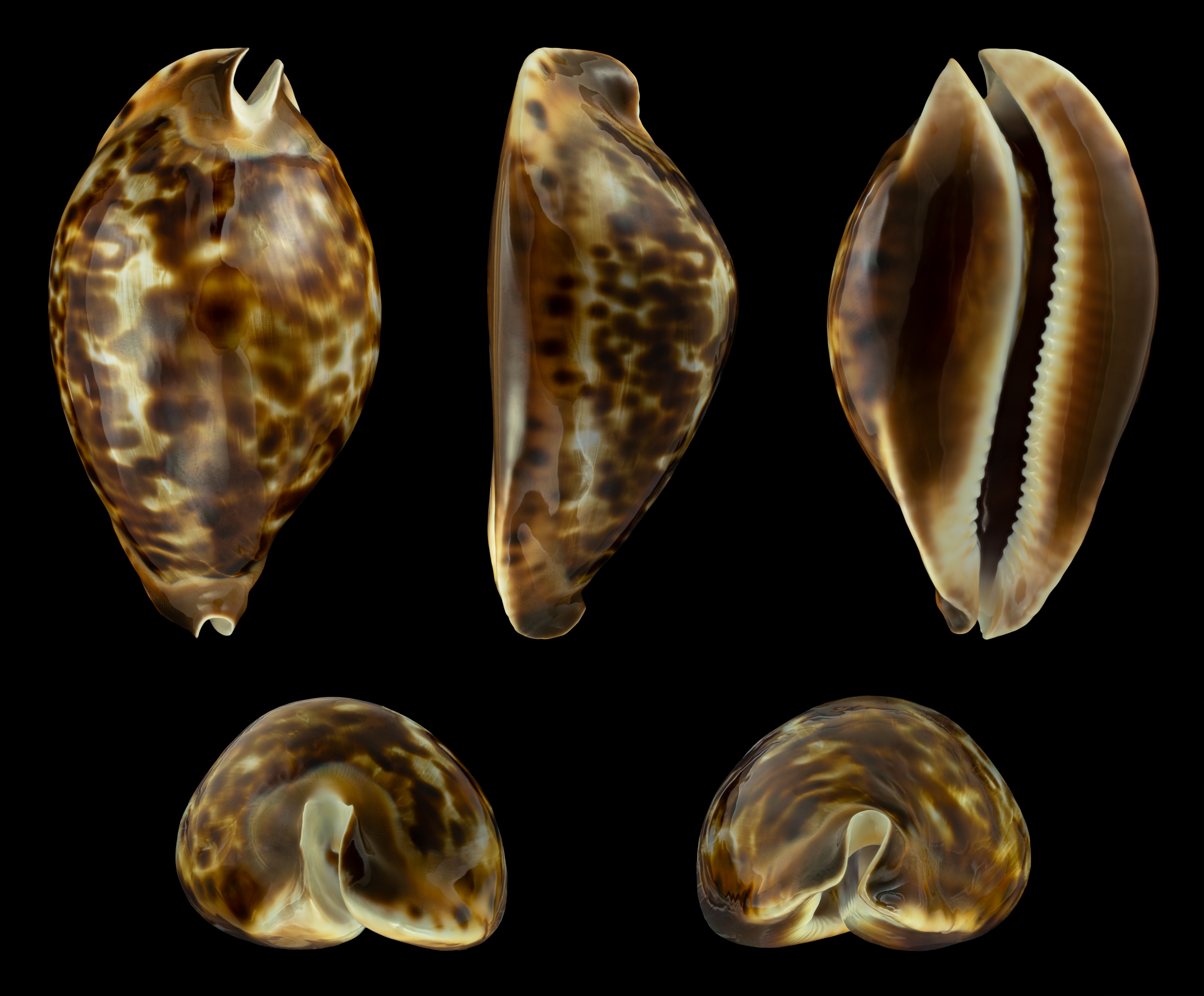

Scientific classification
- Kingdom: Animalia
- Phylum: Mollusca
- Class: Gastropoda
- Subclass: Caenogastropoda
- Order: Littorinimorpha
- Family: Cypraeidae
- Genus: Zoila
- Species: Z. friendii

Binomial name
- Zoila friendii (J. E. Gray, 1831)

Synonyms
- Cypraea friendii J. E. Gray, 1831

= Zoila friendii =

Species of gastropod

Zoila friendii is a species of sea snail, a cowry, a marine gastropod mollusk in the family Cypraeidae, the cowries.

== Subspecies ==
The following subspecies have been recognized :

- Zoila friendii friendii (J. E. Gray, 1831) (synonyms : Zoila scotti Broderip, W.J., 1831 Cypraea scottii Broderip, 1831 )
- Zoila friendii kostini Lorenz & Chiapponi, 2007
- Zoila friendii marina Kostin, 2005
- Zoila friendii vercoi F. Schilder, 1930

== Distribution ==
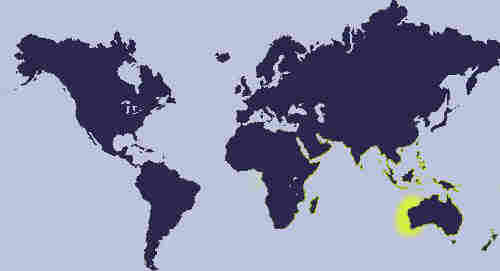
Distribution map of Zoila friendii

This species is distributed along Western Australia.
