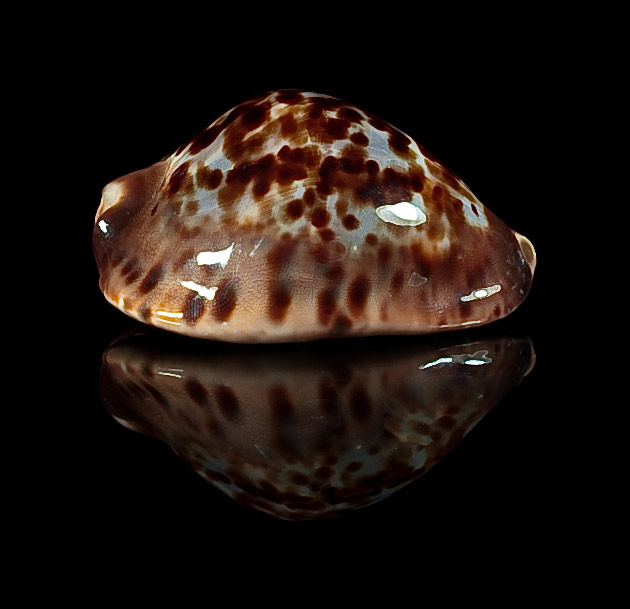

Scientific classification
- Kingdom: Animalia
- Phylum: Mollusca
- Class: Gastropoda
- Subclass: Caenogastropoda
- Order: Littorinimorpha
- Family: Cypraeidae
- Genus: Zoila
- Species: Z. jeaniana

Binomial name
- Zoila jeaniana C. N. Cate, 1968

= Zoila jeaniana =

Species of gastropod

Zoila jeaniana is a species of sea snail, a cowry, a marine gastropod mollusk in the family Cypraeidae, the cowries.
