= Mangelia decipiens =

Scientific classification
- Kingdom: Animalia
- Phylum: Mollusca
- Class: Gastropoda
- Subclass: Caenogastropoda
- Order: Neogastropoda
- Superfamily: Conoidea
- Family: Mangeliidae
- Genus: Mangelia
- Species: M. decipiens

Binomial name
- Mangelia decipiens (E.A. Smith, 1888)

Synonyms
- Pleurotoma (Mangilia) decipiens E.A. Smith, 1888; Zoila atrata Sulliotti, G.R., 1924

Species of gastropod

Mangelia decipiens is a species of sea snail, a marine gastropod mollusk in the family Mangeliidae.

== Description ==
The length of the shell attains 6 mm, its diameter 2 mm.

This species has no very marked distinctive character. The white oblong-ovate shell contains 7 whorls, of which 3 smooth and convex whorls in the protoconch. The subsequent whorls are slightly convex. They show 8-9 ribs. The aperture is small and measures a bit less than half the length of the shell. The spiral striations are generally rather coarse, but some are finer than the others, and the ribs on the body whorl become more remote from each other as they approach the outer lip. The outer lip is incrassate. The truncated siphonal canal is very short.

== Distribution ==
The habitat is unknown.
