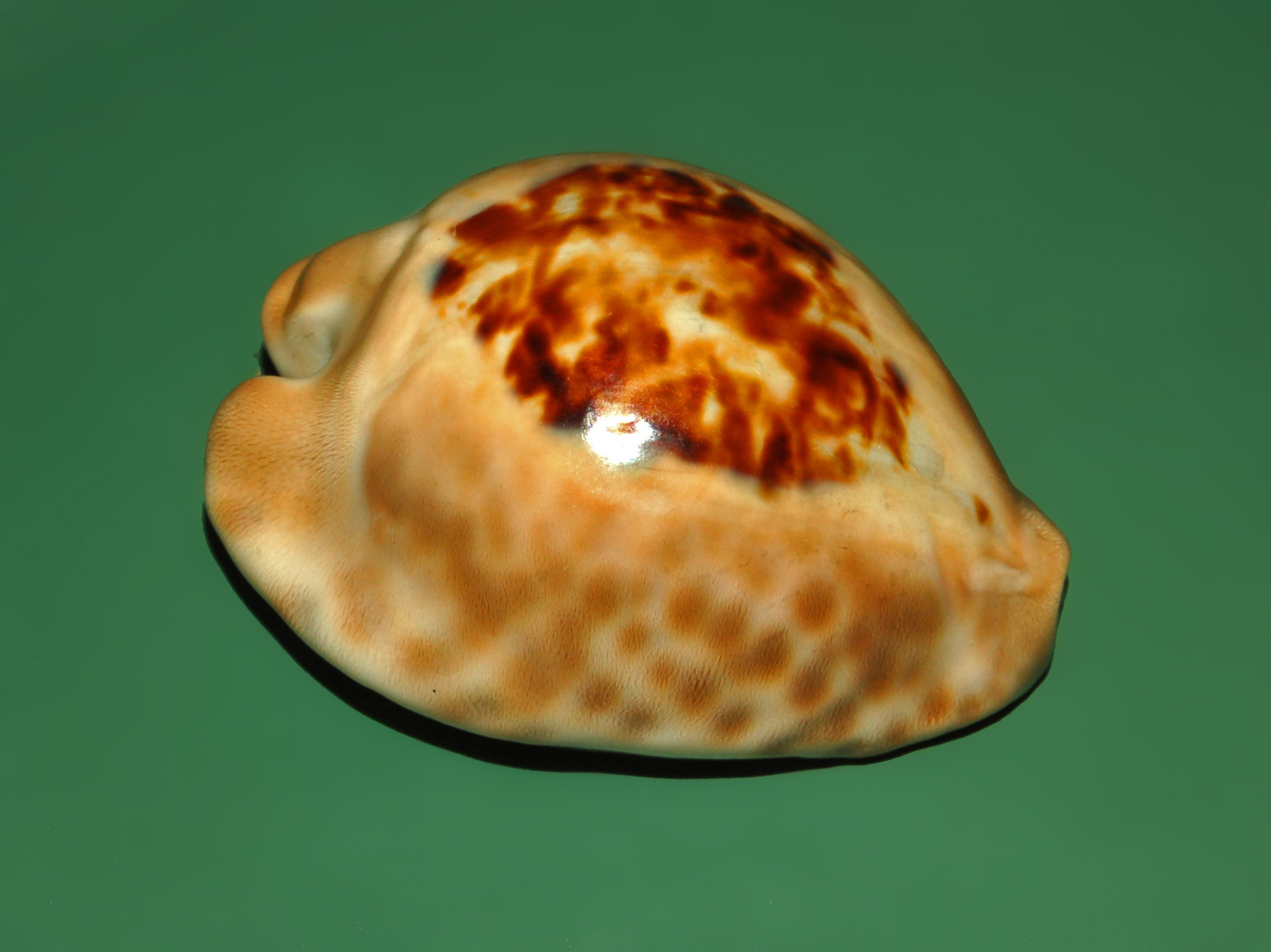
- A shell of Barycypraea teulerei, dorsal view, anterior end towards the right

Scientific classification
- Kingdom: Animalia
- Phylum: Mollusca
- Class: Gastropoda
- Subclass: Caenogastropoda
- Order: Littorinimorpha
- Family: Cypraeidae
- Genus: Barycypraea
- Species: B. teulerei

Binomial name
- Barycypraea teulerei (Cazenavette, 1846)

Synonyms
- Afrozoila teulerei (Cazenavette, 1846); Bernaya teulerei (Cazanavette, B., 1846); Cypraea leucostoma Gaskoin, J.S., 1843; Cypraea teuleri Cazenavette, 1846; Cypraea teulerei Cazenavette, 1845 (Basionym)

= Barycypraea teulerei =

Species of gastropod

Barycypraea teulerei, common name Teulere's cowry, is a species of sea snail, a cowry, a marine gastropod mollusk in the family Cypraeidae, the cowries.

== Description ==
The shells of this uncommon species of cowries (at one time it was considered very rare) reach on average 40–48 millimetres (1.6–1.9 in) in length, with a minimum size of 33 millimetres (1.3 in) and a maximum size of 67 millimetres (2.6 in). They are highly variable in pattern. The dorsum surface is not particularly smooth and shiny as is commonly the case in cowries. The basic color is light beige or cream, with irregular dark brown patches on the top and many light brown spots on the sides. The calloused margins are whitish, while the base is white, with a large sinuous aperture with only traces of labial teeth. Barycypraea teulerei is externally similar to Barycypraea fultoni and Muracypraea mus.

== Distribution ==
This species occurs only in the Arabian Sea along the mainland coast of Oman, and on Masirah Island.

== Habitat ==
These cowries live in intertidal shallow waters, mainly on coral reef but also on sandy and muddy sea bed.
