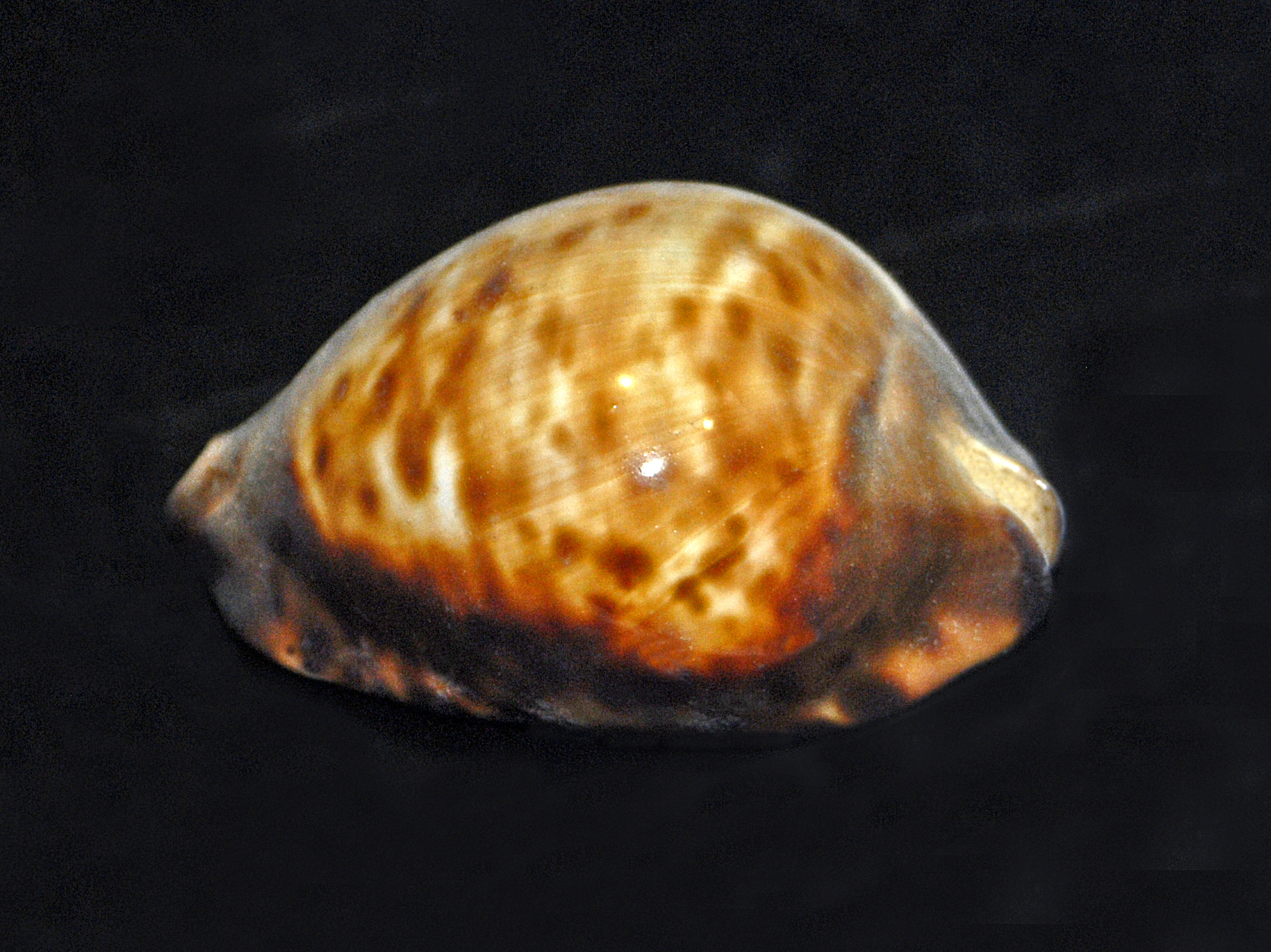
- A lateral view of a shell of Zoila thersites. Anterior end towards the left.

Scientific classification
- Kingdom: Animalia
- Phylum: Mollusca
- Class: Gastropoda
- Subclass: Caenogastropoda
- Order: Littorinimorpha
- Family: Cypraeidae
- Genus: Zoila
- Species: Z. thersites

Binomial name
- Zoila thersites (Gaskoin, 1849)

Synonyms
- Cypraea thersites (Gaskoin, 1849)

= Zoila thersites =

Species of gastropod

Zoila thersites, the humpbacked cowry or black cowry, is a species of sea snail, a cowry, a marine gastropod mollusk in the family Cypraeidae, the cowries.

== Subspecies ==
- Zoila thersites contraria Iredale, 1935
- Zoila thersites thersites Gaskoin, 1849

== Description ==
The shell of Zoila thersites can reach a length of 56–116 millimetres (2.2–4.6 in). This quite rare shell is oval, with a narrow aperture. Dorsum is distinctly arched and the base is pale brown and almost flat. Outer and inner lips have fine teeth. Surface of the shell is smooth and shiny, black or pale brown, more or less densely covered with large irregular dark brown spots. Mantle and foot are very developed. The mantle covers almost entirely the shells. This species lays eggs capsules with a single fertilized egg. When it hatches, the larva feeds on the so-called nurse eggs.

== Distribution and habitat ==
This endemic species occurs in the sea along Southern Australia. These beautiful cowries live from the intertidal zone to the deep reef, but they prefer shallow waters, near the intertidal rocky seabed. At dawn or dusk they start to prey on sponges, foraminifera, algae and small crustaceans.

== Name ==
Name Zoila Thersites is a reference to a minor character from the second part of a tragic play Faust by Johann Wolfgang Goethe. It is a neologism by the author made from words Zoilus and Thersites.
