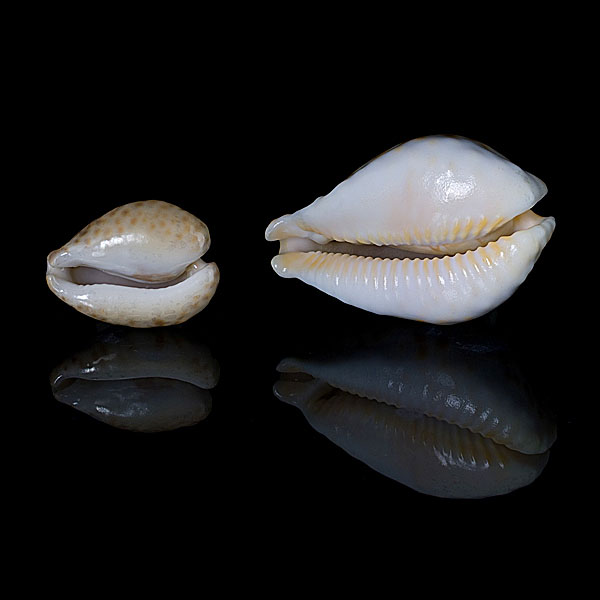
- Apertural views of shells of Barycypraea fultoni (right) and Bernaya teulerei (left)

Scientific classification
- Kingdom: Animalia
- Phylum: Mollusca
- Class: Gastropoda
- Subclass: Caenogastropoda
- Order: Littorinimorpha
- Family: Cypraeidae
- Genus: Barycypraea
- Species: B. fultoni

Binomial name
- Barycypraea fultoni (Sowerby III, 1903)

Synonyms
- Bernaya fultoni (Sowerby III, 1903); Cypraea fultoni Sowerby III, 1903

= Barycypraea fultoni =

Species of gastropod

Barycypraea fultoni (also known as the Fulton's cowry or Maltese cross cowry) ranks among the most famous and sought-after species of the family Cypraeidae.

== Discovery ==
Before the 1980s, fewer than 40 specimens of Barycypraea fultoni were known. This rareness was due to the fact that all shell specimens of this sea snail were exclusively discovered from the stomachs of fish such as Sparodons, and had to be removed within a few hours of having been swallowed to prevent the stomach acid of the fish from damaging the specimen.

In the mid-1980s, however, Russian trawlers began to find thousands of specimens along Mozambique. The large number of specimens now available were first separated into two subspecies (pyriform fultoni fultoni and extremely calloused specimens named fultoni amorimi ) and later four subspecies. While the subdivision of the specimens from South African waters (fultoni) and Mozambican waters (amorimi) is also well supported by molecular data, there remains an uncertainty concerning the two taxa from shallower waters from the same general areas (deltoidea in South Africa and massieri in Mozambique). Their position either as bathymetric subspecies or bathymetric forms is an open question.

== Market value ==
In the 1980s, an American collector bought the then world record size (slightly less than 80 mm) specimen for US$22,000. Shortly after, three of these specimens were purchased by Dr. Luigi Raybaudi Massilia, with one specimen over 80mm being purchased for US$25,000. As noted by Guinness World Records, this was the highest price paid for a seashell at the time.

== Subspecies ==
- Barycypraea fultoni amorimi Raybaudi Massilia, L., 1990
- Barycypraea fultoni fultoni (Sowerby, G.B. III, 1903)

== Description ==
Shell size is 60–85 mm.

== Distribution ==
This species is distributed in the Indian Ocean along the coasts of East Africa and South Africa.
