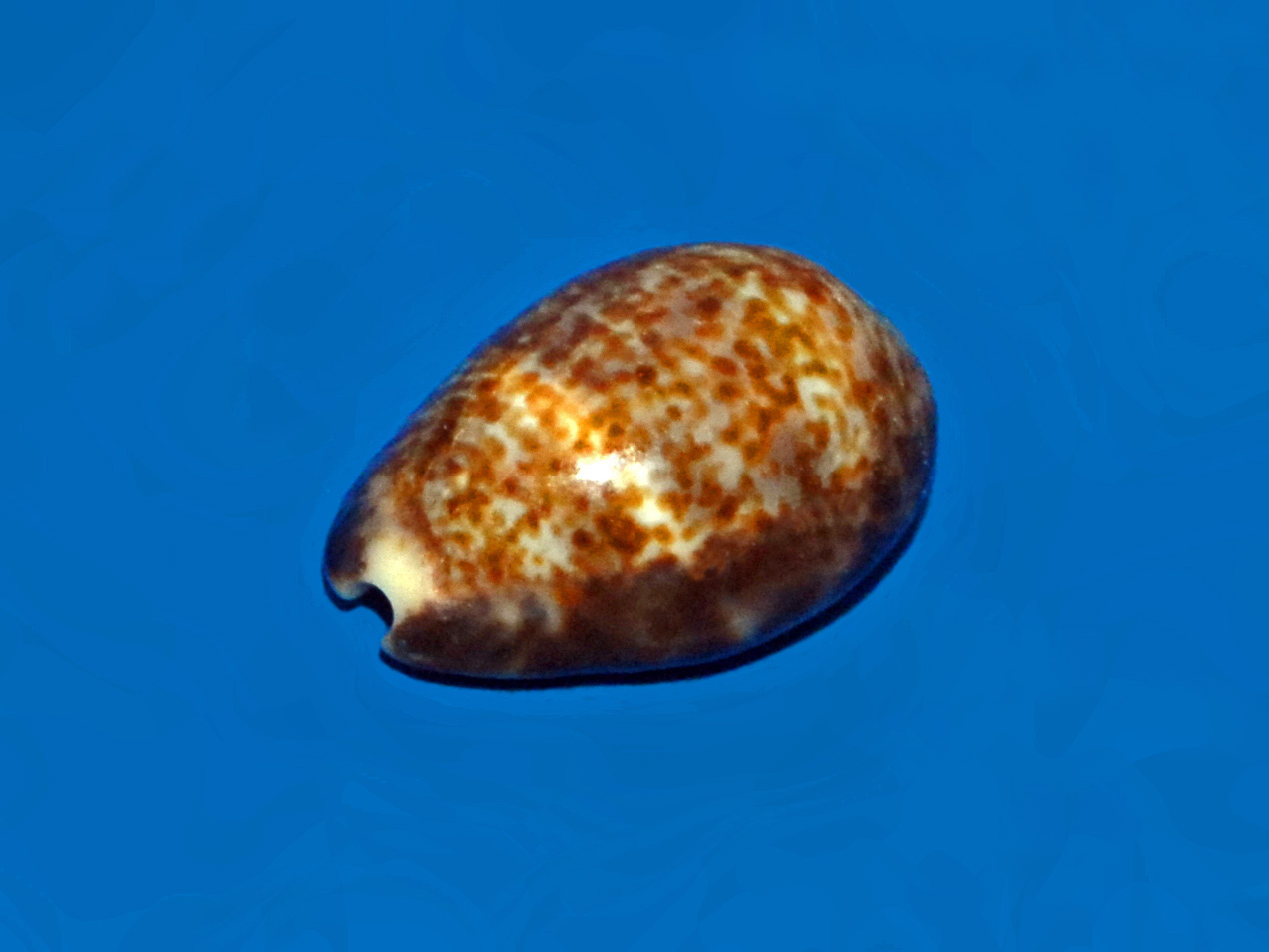
- Shell of Melicerona felina from Saudi Arabia at the Museo Civico di Storia Naturale di Milano

Scientific classification
- Kingdom: Animalia
- Phylum: Mollusca
- Class: Gastropoda
- Subclass: Caenogastropoda
- Order: Littorinimorpha
- Family: Cypraeidae
- Genus: Melicerona
- Species: M. felina

Binomial name
- Melicerona felina (Gmelin, 1791)

Synonyms
- Cypraea felina Gmelin, 1791; Cypraea felina felina Gmelin, 1791; Palmadusta felina (Gmelin, 1791); Palmadusta felina felina (Gmelin, 1791)

= Melicerona felina =

Species of gastropod

Melicerona felina, common name the kitten cowrie, is a species of sea snail, a cowry, a marine gastropod mollusk in the family Cypraeidae, the cowries.

== Description ==
Melicerona felina has a shell reaching a size of 10–30 mm. Dorsum has a somewhat banded and spotted pattern with a yellow-brown coloration. It lives under coral slabs on leeward intertidal reefs, at a depth of 2–4 m.

== Distribution ==
This species is distributed in the Red Sea and in the Indian Ocean along Aldabra, Chagos, the Comores, the East Coast of South Africa, Kenya, Madagascar, the Mascarene Basin, Mauritius, Mozambique, Réunion, the Seychelles, Somalia and Tanzania.
