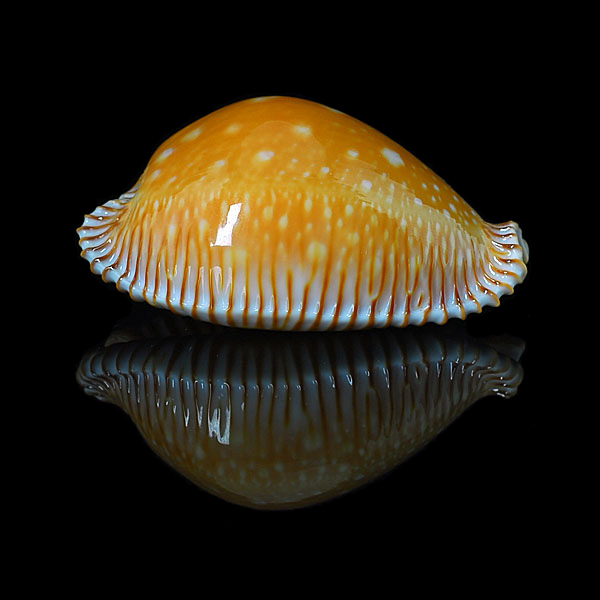
- Lateral view of a shell of Perisserosa guttata

Scientific classification
- Domain: Eukaryota
- Kingdom: Animalia
- Phylum: Mollusca
- Class: Gastropoda
- Subclass: Caenogastropoda
- Order: Littorinimorpha
- Family: Cypraeidae
- Genus: Perisserosa
- Species: P. guttata

Binomial name
- Perisserosa guttata Gray, 1825

Synonyms
- Cypraea guttata Gmelin, 1791 (original combination); Erosaria guttata (Gmelin, 1791); Erosaria guttata azumai F. A. Schilder, 1960; Perisserosa brocktoni Iredale, 1930; Perisserosa guttata var. azumai (F. A. Schilder, 1960) ·; Perisserosa guttata guttata (Gmelin, 1791) · accepted, alternate representation; Perisserosa guttata var. azumai Schilder, 1960

= Perisserosa guttata =

Species of gastropod

Perisserosa guttata, common name the drop-covered cowry, is a species of sea snail, a marine gastropod mollusk in the family Cypraeidae, the cowries.

Subspecies:

- Perisserosa guttata guttata (Gmelin, 1791)
- Perisserosa guttata surinensis (Raybaudi, 1978)

== Shell description ==
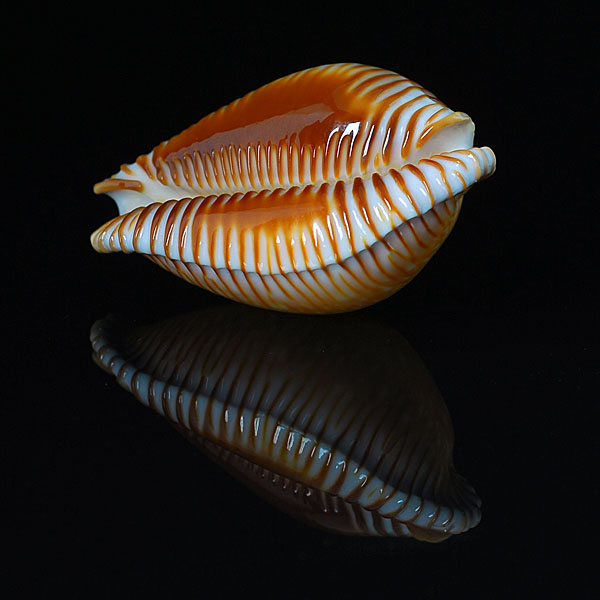
Shell of Perisserosa guttata guttata.

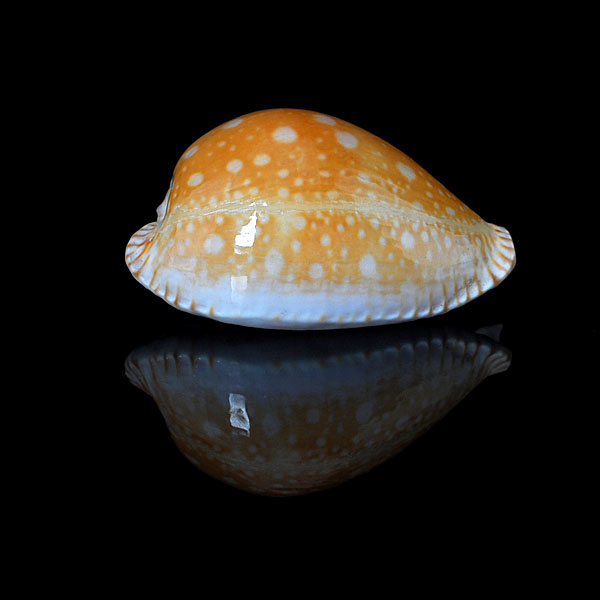
Perisserosa guttata azumai

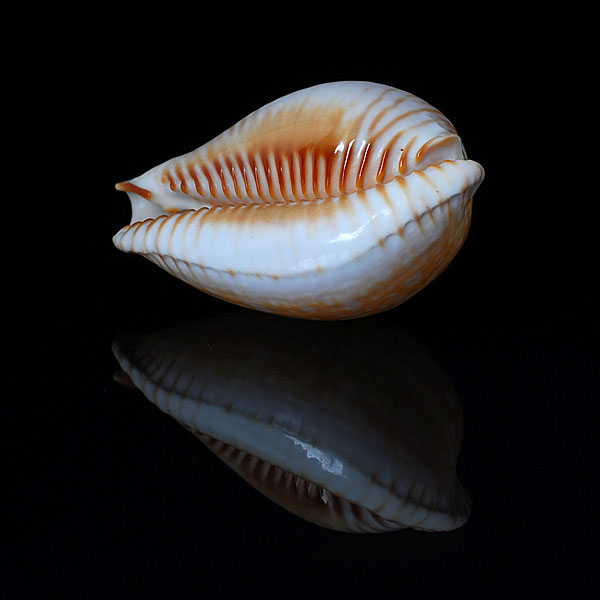
Perisserosa guttata azumai
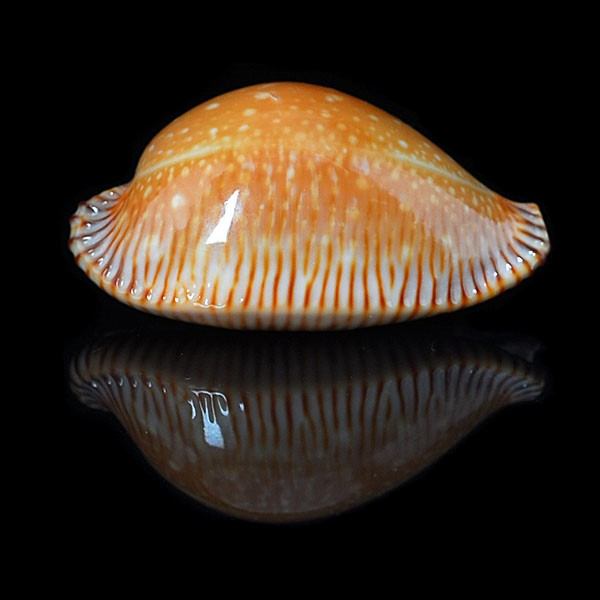
Perisserosa guttata surinensis

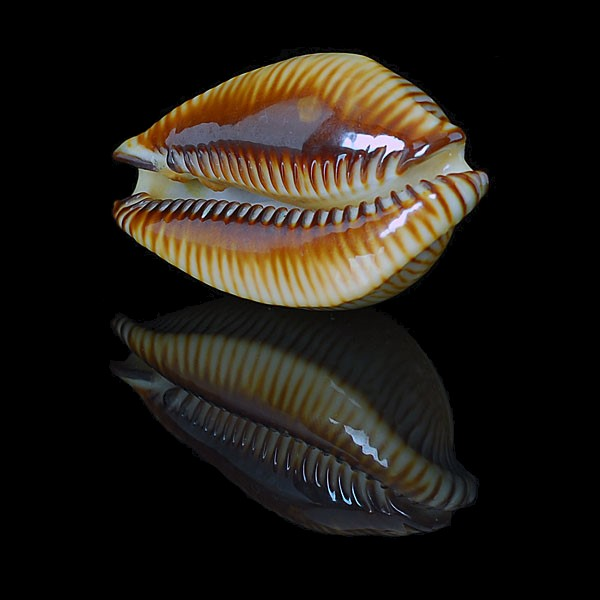
Perisserosa guttata surinensis

== Distribution ==
This marine species occurs in the South China Sea; off Japan, the Philippines, Melanesia and Australia (Queensland)

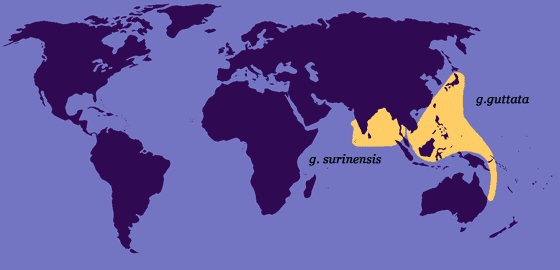
Map of distribution of Perisserosa guttata guttata and Perisserosa guttata surinensis.
