= P. surinamensis =

P. surinamensis may refer to:

- Propustularia surinamensis, a sea snail species
- Pycnoscelus surinamensis, the Surinam cockroach, an insect species
