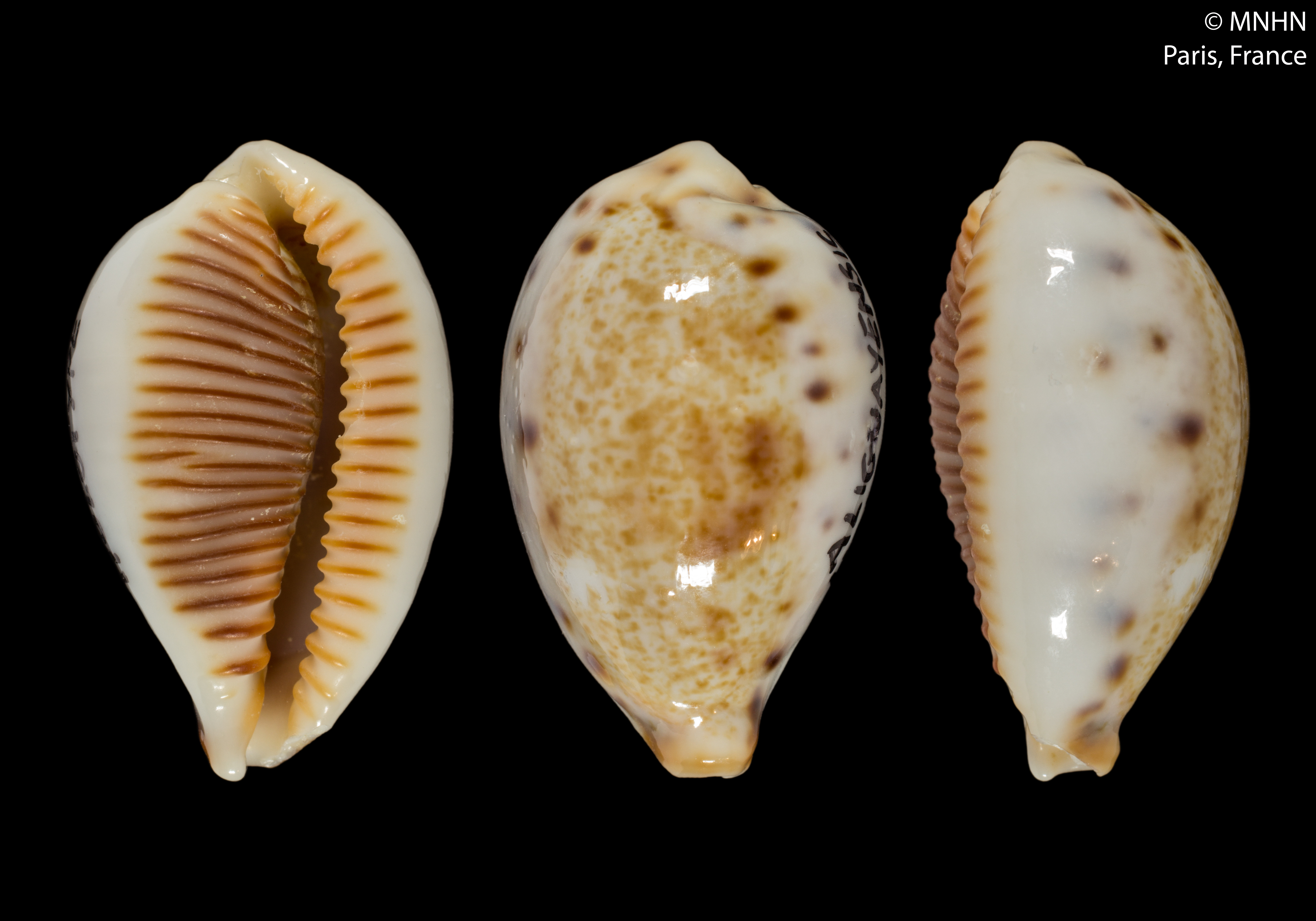
- Shell of Ficadusta pulchella aliguayensis (holotype at MNHN, Paris)

Scientific classification
- Kingdom: Animalia
- Phylum: Mollusca
- Class: Gastropoda
- Subclass: Caenogastropoda
- Order: Littorinimorpha
- Family: Cypraeidae
- Genus: Ficadusta
- Species: F. pulchella

Binomial name
- Ficadusta pulchella (Swainson, 1823)

Synonyms
- Adusta pulchella (Swainson, 1823); Contradusta pulchella (Swainson, 1823); Contradusta pulchella pulchella (Swainson, 1823); Cypraea pulchella (Swainson, 1823); Erronea pulchella (Swainson, 1823); Erronea pulchella pulchella (Swainson, 1823); Ficadusta pulchella pulchella (Swainson, 1823)· accepted, alternate representation

= Ficadusta pulchella =

Species of gastropod

Ficadusta pulchella is a species of sea snail, a cowry, a marine gastropod mollusc in the family Cypraeidae, the cowries.

Subspecies

- Ficadusta pulchella aliguayensis (van Heesvelde & Deprez, 2002)
- Ficadusta pulchella novaebritanniae (F. A. Schilder & M. Schilder, 1937)
- Ficadusta pulchella pericalles (Melvill & Standen, 1904)
