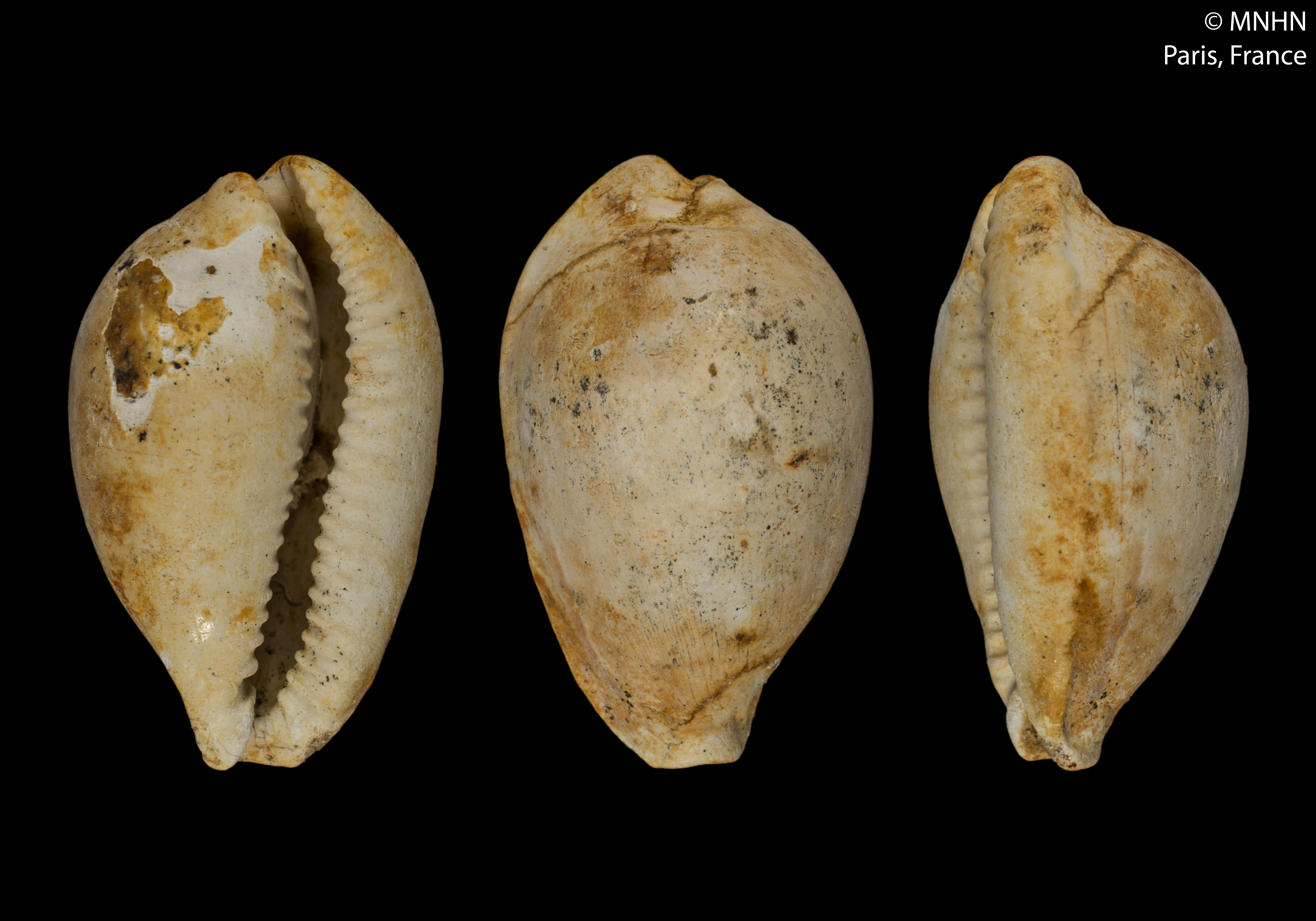
- Shell of † Praerosaria amoenacea (holotype at MNHN, Paris)

Scientific classification
- Kingdom: Animalia
- Phylum: Mollusca
- Class: Gastropoda
- Subclass: Caenogastropoda
- Order: Littorinimorpha
- Superfamily: Cypraeoidea
- Family: Cypraeidae
- Genus: †Praerosaria; Dolin & Lozouet, 2004

Type species
- † Cypraea (Proadusta) splendens var. exflaveola Sacco, 1894

Synonyms
- † Cypraeacites Schlotheim, 1820 (unavailable name under ICZN Art. 20.)

= Praerosaria =

Extinct genus of sea snails

Praerosaria is an extinct genus of gastropods belonging to the subfamily Erosariinae of the family Cypraeidae.

== Species ==
- † Praerosaria amoenacea Dolin & Lozouet, 2004
- † Praerosaria besucus Pacaud, 2018
- † Praerosaria biacuta Dolin & Lozouet, 2004
- † Praerosaria borysthenis Pacaud, 2018
- † Praerosaria charlenae Dolin & Lozouet, 2004
- † Praerosaria espibosensis Dolin & Lozouet, 2004
- † Praerosaria exflaveola (Sacco, 1894)
- † Praerosaria herosae Dolin & Lozouet, 2004
- † Praerosaria paulonaria Dolin & Lozouet, 2004
- † Praerosaria perlacea Dolin & Lozouet, 2004
- † Praerosaria pseudorugosa Dolin & Lozouet, 2004
- † Praerosaria stampinensis (Sacco, 1894)
- † Praerosaria stefanskyii Pacaud, 2018
- † Praerosaria tabulata Dolin & Lozouet, 2004
- † Praerosaria virodunensis Dolin & Lozouet, 2004
