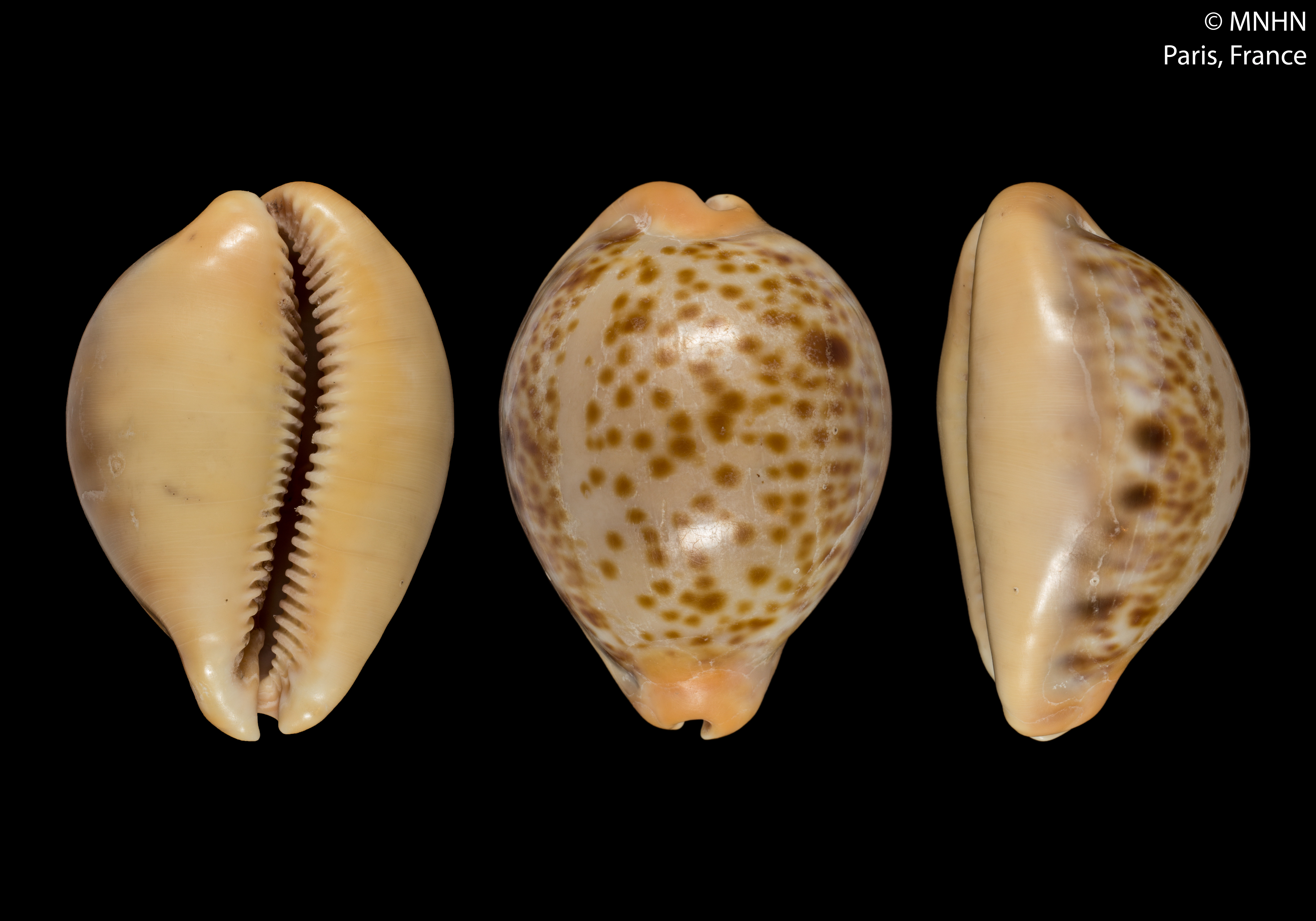
- Shell of Raybaudia porteri nigromaculata (holotype at MNHN, Paris)

Scientific classification
- Kingdom: Animalia
- Phylum: Mollusca
- Class: Gastropoda
- Subclass: Caenogastropoda
- Order: Littorinimorpha
- Superfamily: Cypraeoidea
- Family: Cypraeidae
- Genus: Raybaudia; Lorenz, 2017

Type species
- Cypraea porteri C. N. Cate, 1966

= Raybaudia =

Genus of gastropods

Raybaudia is a genus of sea snails, marine gastropod molluscs in the family Cypraeidae, the cowries.

== Species ==
- Raybaudia joycae (Clover, 1970)
- Raybaudia porteri (C. N. Cate, 1966)
