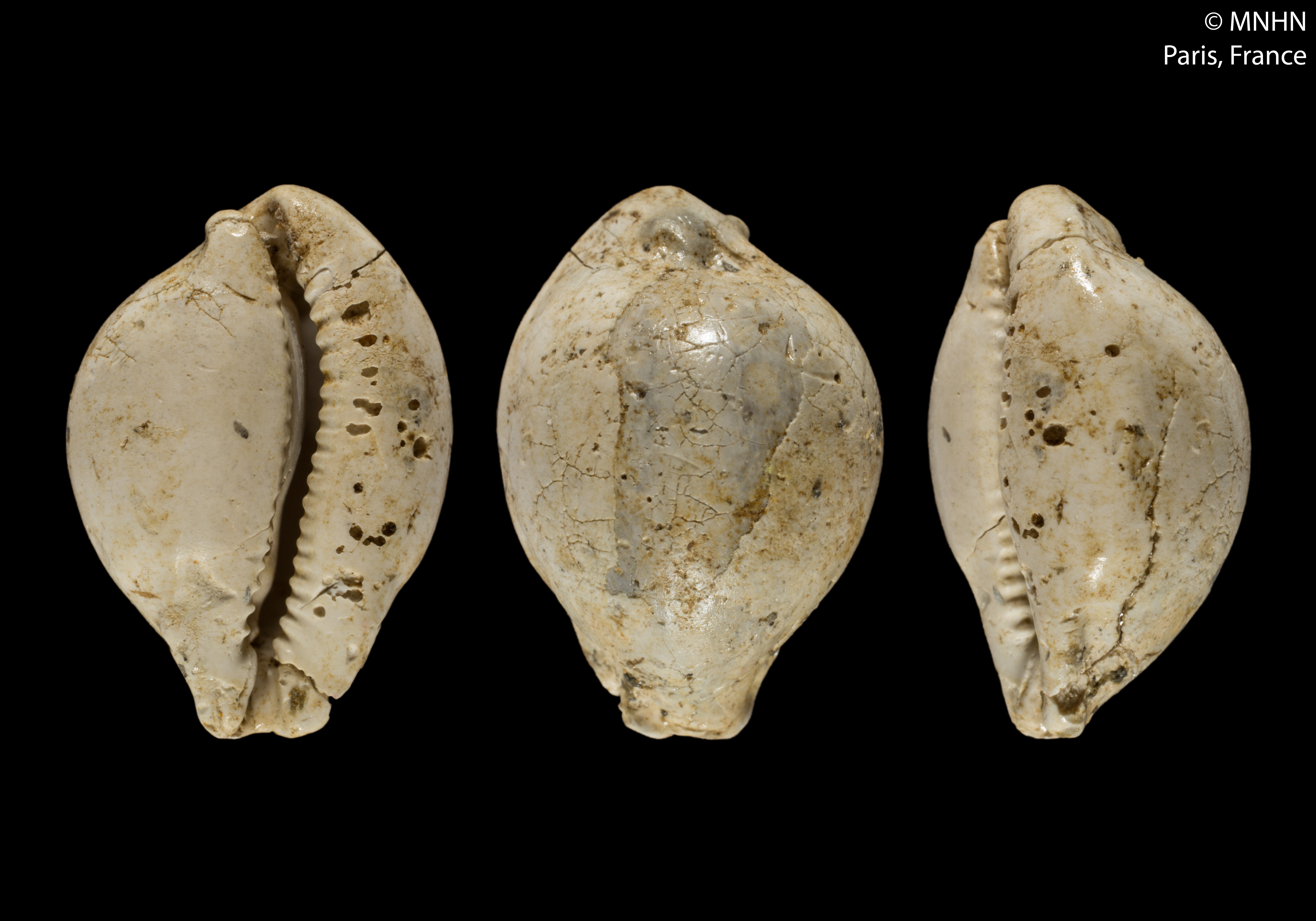
- Shell of Subepona herrerensis (holotype at MNHN, Paris)

Scientific classification
- Kingdom: Animalia
- Phylum: Mollusca
- Class: Gastropoda
- Subclass: Caenogastropoda
- Order: Littorinimorpha
- Superfamily: Cypraeoidea
- Family: Cypraeidae
- Genus: †Subepona; Dolin & Lozouet, 2004

Type species
- † Subepona herrerensis Dolin & Lozouet, 2004

Synonyms
- † Eopustularia Fehse, 2010

= Subepona =

Extinct genus of gastropods

Subepona is an extinct genus of gastropods belonging to the subfamily Erosariinae of the family Cypraeidae.

== Species ==
- † Subepona amitrovi Dolin & Aguerre, 2018
- † Subepona anhaltina (Giebel, 1861)
- † Subepona antiqua (Lamarck, 1810)
- † Subepona arcyensis (de Raincourt, 1876)
- † Subepona barbei Dolin & Aguerre, 2018
- † Subepona basilica Dolin & Aguerre, 2018
- † Subepona berezovskyi Dolin & Aguerre, 2018
- † Subepona brackleshamensis (Schilder, 1929)
- † Subepona caelatura Dolin & Aguerre, 2018
- † Subepona cattoi Dolin & Aguerre, 2018
- † Subepona cluzaudi Pacaud, 2018
- † Subepona dilatata Dolin & Aguerre, 2018
- † Subepona exspectata Dolin & Aguerre, 2018
- † Subepona fusoides Dolin & Aguerre, 2018
- † Subepona gracillima Dolin & Aguerre, 2018
- † Subepona harmonica Dolin & Aguerre, 2018
- † Subepona herrerensis Dolin & Lozouet, 2004
- † Subepona hungarica Pacaud & Vicián, 2019
- † Subepona insolita Dolin & Aguerre, 2018
- † Subepona javelina Dolin & Aguerre, 2018
- † Subepona laminata Dolin & Aguerre, 2018
- † Subepona moloni (Bayan, 1870)
- † Subepona notabilis Dolin & Aguerre, 2018
- † Subepona orbiculata Dolin & Aguerre, 2018
- † Subepona pacaudi Ledon, 2018
- † Subepona rixatoria Dolin & Aguerre, 2018
- † Subepona romaneki Dolin & Aguerre, 2018
- † Subepona scutula Dolin & Aguerre, 2018
- † Subepona trigonella Dolin & Aguerre, 2018
- † Subepona vultuosa Dolin & Aguerre, 2018

Synonyms

- † Subepona caneveti Dolin & Aguerre, 2018: synonym of † Subepona brackleshamensis (Schilder, 1929)
