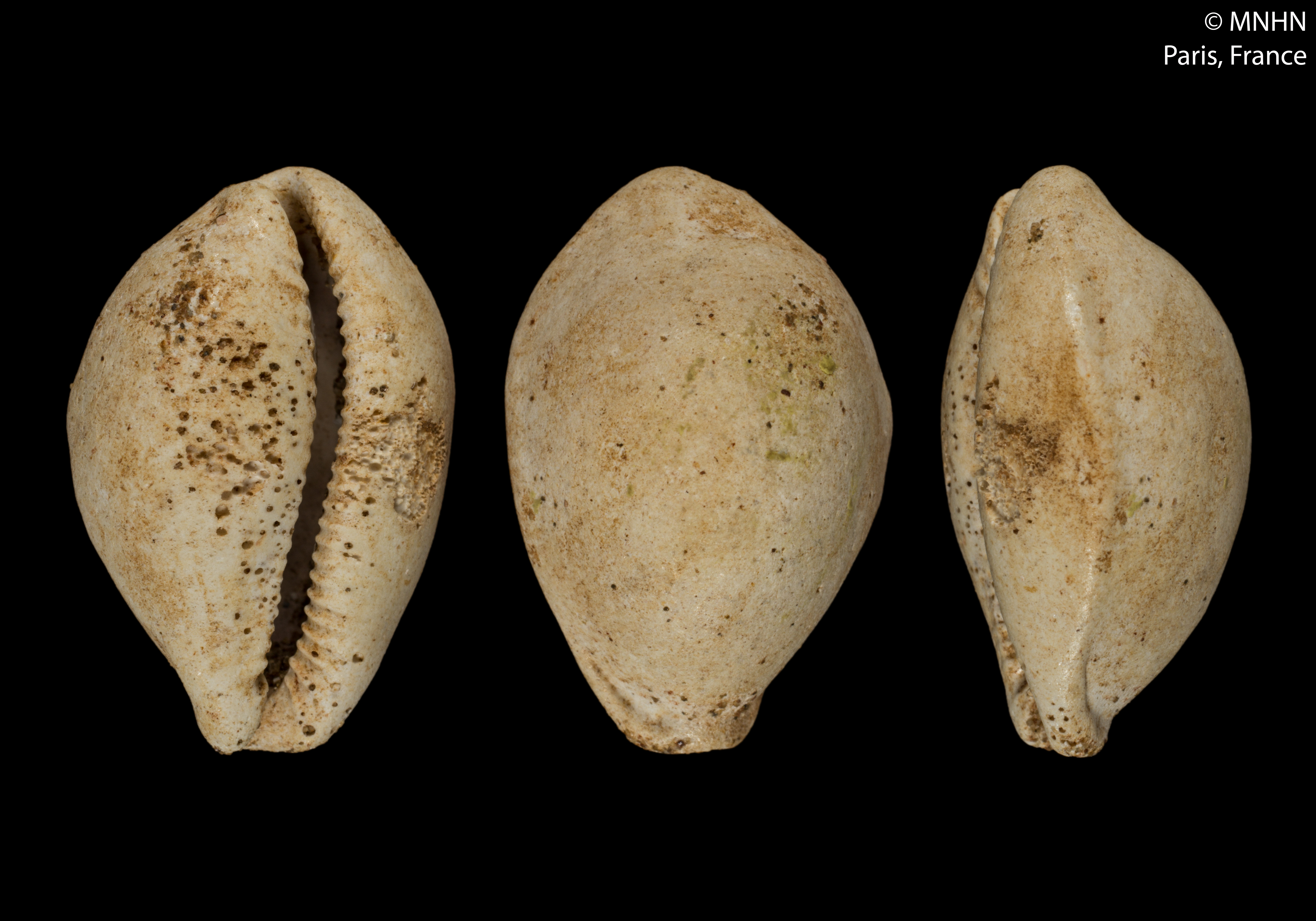
- Fossil shell of Zonarina aturensis

Scientific classification
- Kingdom: Animalia
- Phylum: Mollusca
- Class: Gastropoda
- Subclass: Caenogastropoda
- Order: Littorinimorpha
- Superfamily: Cypraeoidea
- Family: Cypraeidae
- Genus: †Zonarina; Sacco, 1894

Type species
- †Cypraea annulus var. pinguis Grateloup, 1846

Synonyms
- †Cypraea (Zonarina) Sacco, 1894 superseded combination; †Zonarina (Zonarina) Sacco, 1894

= Zonarina (gastropod) =

Zonarina Temporal range: Oligocene - Miocene

Extinct genus of gastropods

Zonarina is an extinct genus of sea snail, a cowry, a marine gastropod mollusk in the subfamily Zonariinae of the family Cypraeidae, the cowries.

== Type species ==
When Sacco established Zonarina, he included the single species Cypraea pinguis, with two varieties, longovulina and spiratina, both Sacco, 1894, and Dolin & Lozouet [2004, Cossmanniana, hors ser. 4: 39] have cited Cypraea pinguis longovulina Sacco, 1894, as the type species by OD. However, under Art. 68.3, C. pinguis is the type species by monotypy ("regardless of any cited subspecies").

== Fossil record ==
Fossils are found in marine strata from the Oligocene to the Miocene (age range: from 23.03 to 5.332 million years ago.). Fossils are known from Italy and France.

== Species ==
- †Zonarina abbreviata (Dolin & Lozouet, 2004)
- †Zonarina aturensis Dolin & Lozouet, 2004
- †Zonarina estotiensis (Dolin & Lozouet, 2004)
- †Zonarina maynotensis Dolin & Lozouet, 2004
- †Zonarina parasigmapertura (Dolin & Lozouet, 2004)
- †Zonarina pinguis (Grateloup, 1846)
- †Zonarina subelongata (d'Orbigny, 1852)
