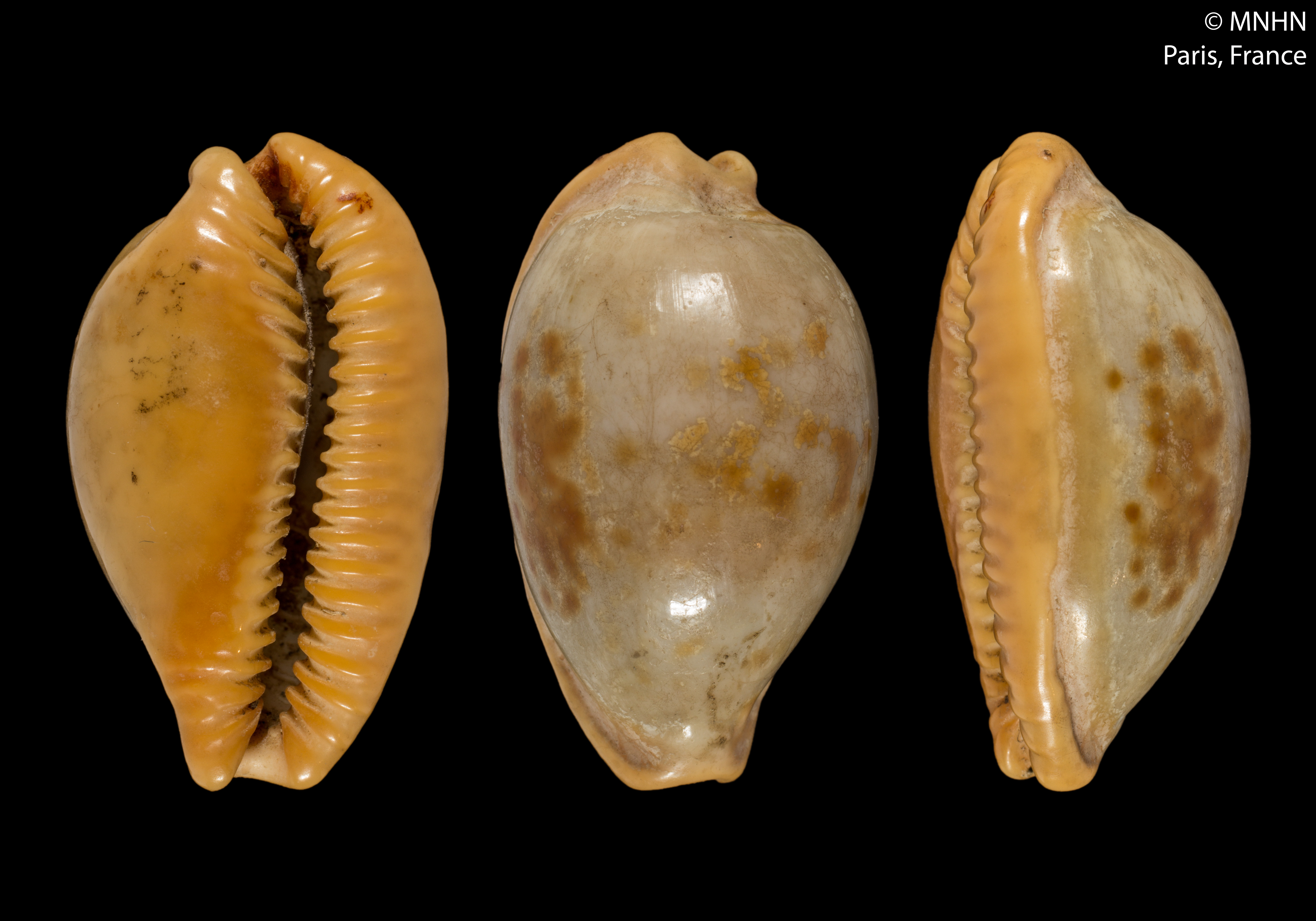
- Shell of Propustularia surinamensis (syntype at MNHN, Paris)

Scientific classification
- Kingdom: Animalia
- Phylum: Mollusca
- Class: Gastropoda
- Subclass: Caenogastropoda
- Order: Littorinimorpha
- Family: Cypraeidae
- Genus: Propustularia
- Species: P. surinamensis

Binomial name
- Propustularia surinamensis (G. Perry, 1811)

Synonyms
- Cypraea aubryana Jousseaume, 1869; Cypraea bicallosa Gray, 1831; Cypraea ingloria Crosse, 1878; Cypraea surinamensis Perry, 1811 (Original combination)

= Propustularia surinamensis =

Species of gastropod

Propustularia surinamensis, common name the Surinam cowry or Suriname cowrie, is a species of sea snail, a cowry, a marine gastropod mollusk in the family Cypraeidae, the cowries. The common name and specific epithet refer to the northern South American country of Suriname (formerly the Dutch colony of Surinam).

== Distribution ==
This species is native to the Gulf of Mexico and Caribbean Sea, including the Gulf and Caribbean coasts of North, Central, and South America.

Occasionally dredged at 500 ft. depths, off West coast Barbados.

== Description ==
The maximum recorded shell length is 48 mm.

== Habitat ==
Minimum recorded depth is 7 m. Maximum recorded depth is 780 m.
