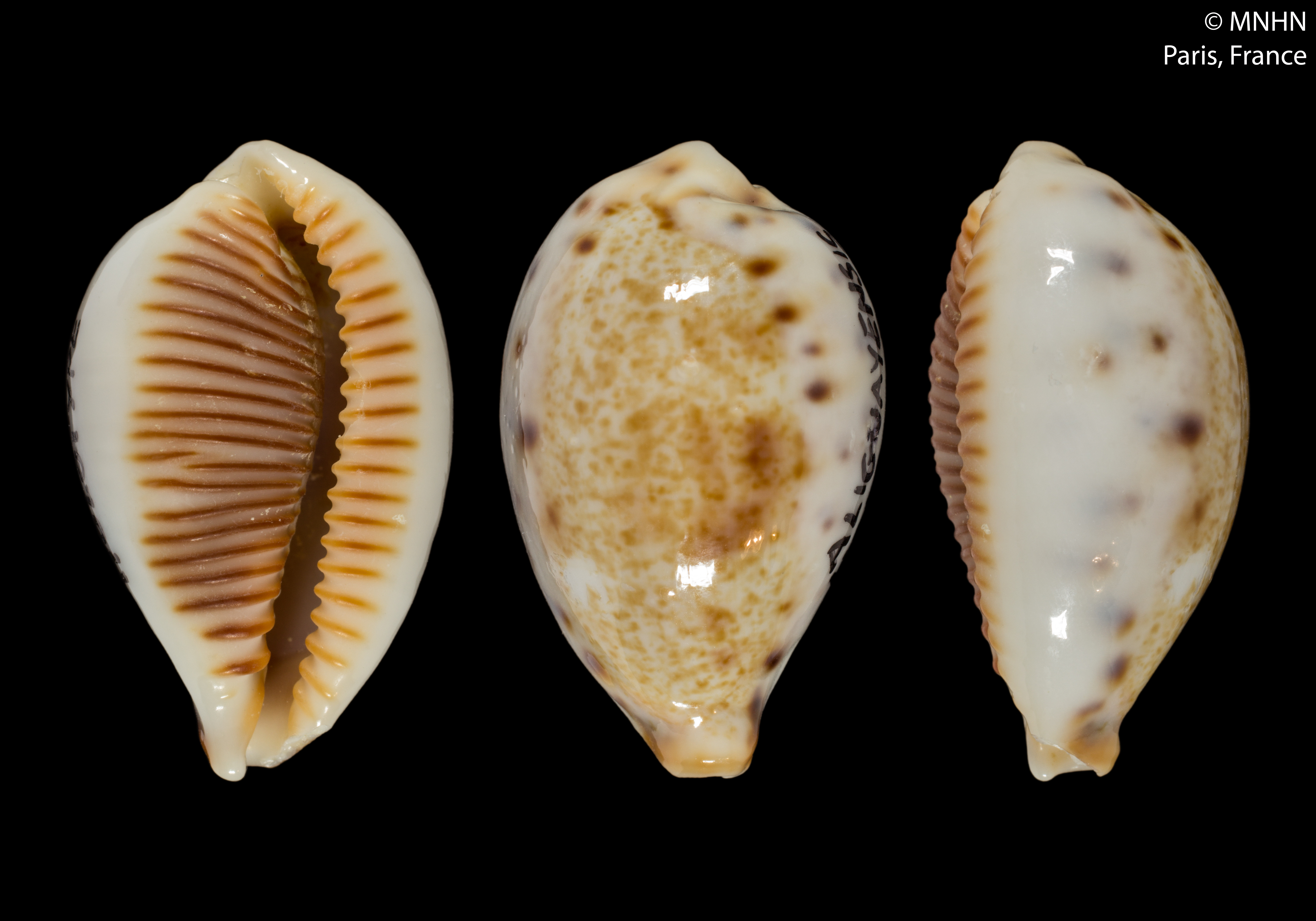
- Shell of Ficadusta pulchella aliguayensis (holotype at MNHN, Paris)

Scientific classification
- Kingdom: Animalia
- Phylum: Mollusca
- Class: Gastropoda
- Subclass: Caenogastropoda
- Order: Littorinimorpha
- Superfamily: Cypraeoidea
- Family: Cypraeidae
- Genus: Ficadusta; Habe & Kosuge, 1966

Type species
- Cypraea pulchella Swainson, 1823

= Ficadusta =

Genus of gastropods

Ficadusta is a genus of sea snails, marine gastropod mollusks in the family Cypraeidae, the cowries.

== Species ==
Species within the genus Ficadusta include:

- Ficadusta pulchella (Swainson, 1823)

Species brought into synonymy

- Ficadusta barclayi (Reeve, 1857): synonym of Paradusta barclayi (Reeve, 1857)
