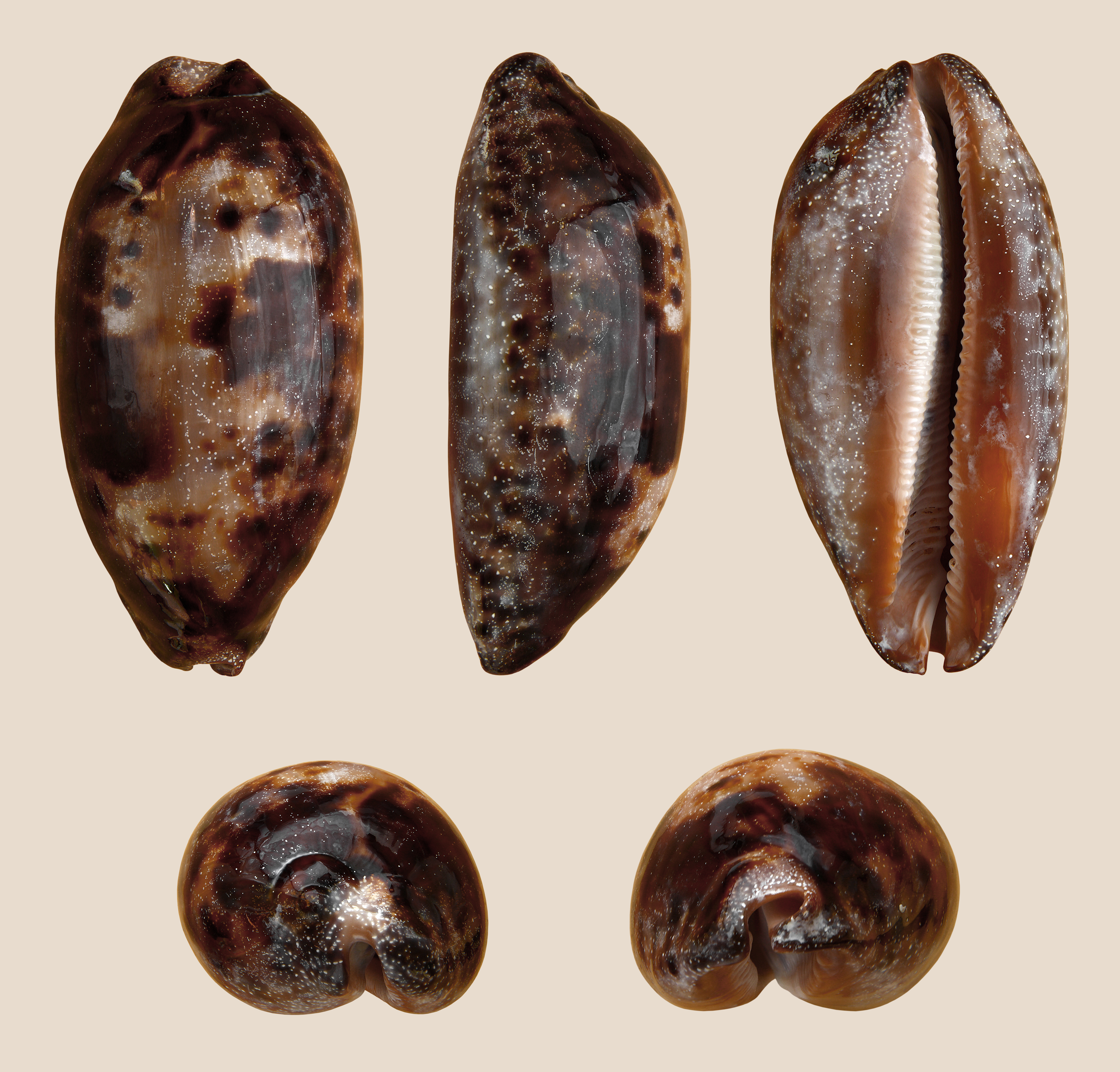
- Five views of a shell of Chelycypraea testudinaria
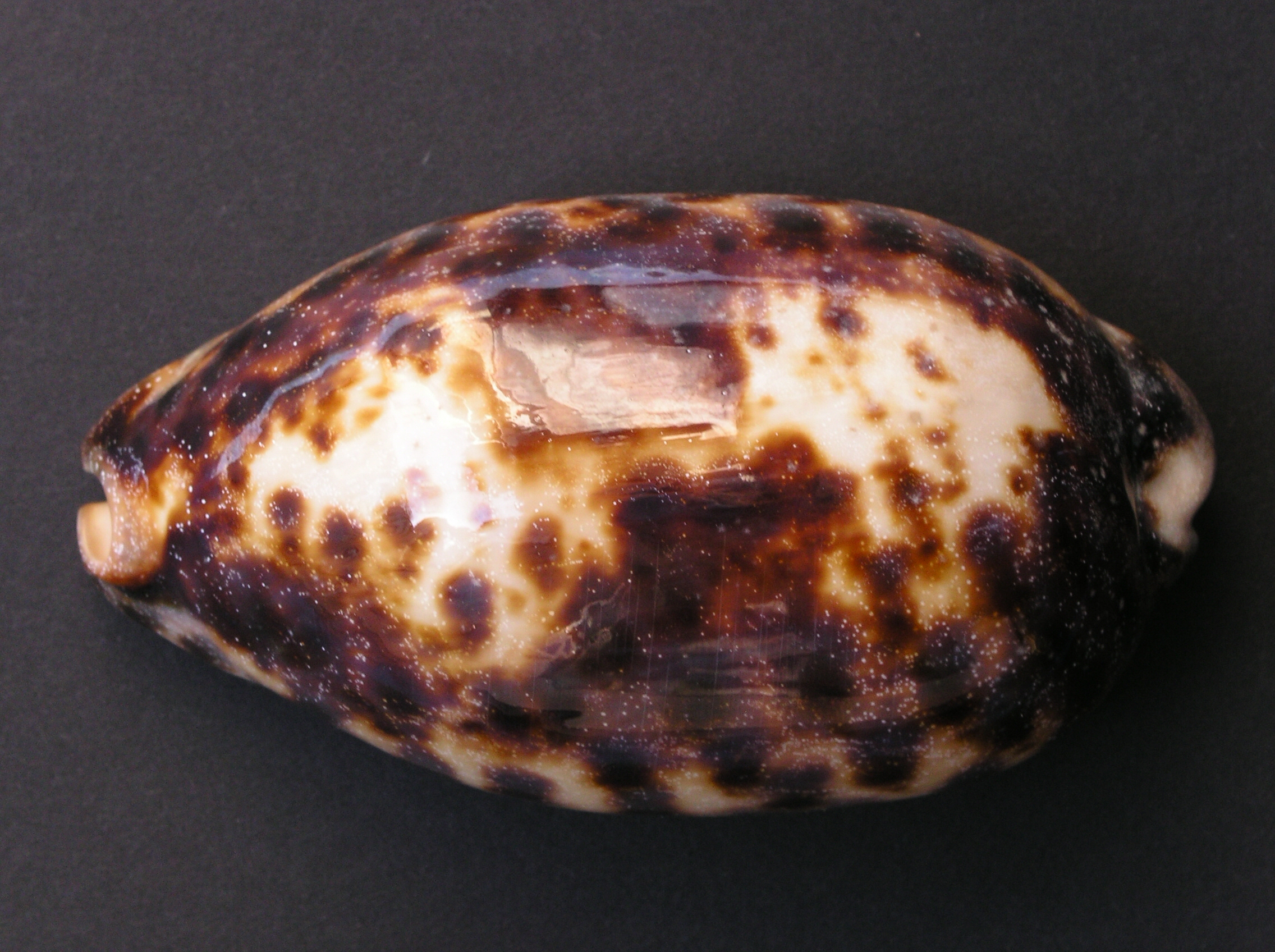
- Dorsal view of a shell of Chelycypraea testudinaria

Scientific classification
- Kingdom: Animalia
- Phylum: Mollusca
- Class: Gastropoda
- Subclass: Caenogastropoda
- Order: Littorinimorpha
- Family: Cypraeidae
- Subfamily: Luriinae
- Tribe: Austrocypraeini
- Genus: Chelycypraea; F. A. Schilder, 1927
- Species: C. testudinaria

Binomial name
- Chelycypraea testudinaria (Linnaeus, 1758)

Synonyms
- Callistocypraea testudinaria (Linnaeus, 1758); Callistocypraea testudinaria ingens Schilder; Cypraea testudinaria Linnaeus, 1758 (basionym); Cypraea testudinaria ingens (Schilder & Schilder); Cypraea testudinosa Perry, 1811

= Chelycypraea =

Genus of gastropods

Chelycypraea testudinaria, common name the tortoise cowry, is a species of sea snail, a cowry, a marine gastropod mollusc in the family Cypraeidae, the cowries. It is the only species in the genus Chelycpraea.

There is one subspecies, Chelycypraea testudinaria ingens Schilder, F.A. & M. Schilder, 1939

== Description ==
The shells of these quite uncommon cowries reach on average 90–110 millimetres (3.5–4.3 in) of length, with a minimum size of 75 millimetres (3.0 in) and a maximum size of 142 millimetres (5.6 in). They are variable in pattern and color. The shape is oval or sub-cylindrical, the dorsum surface is smooth and shiny, the basic color is whitish or yellowish and it is covered by very irregular dark brown patches and spots. The margins are white or pale brown, with some large dark dots. The base may be whitish, pale brown or pink, the aperture is long and narrow and the teeth are white, short and fine. In the living animal the mantle is bluish-greyish and almost transparent, while the sensorial papillae are lighter and rather long. The mantle and foot are well developed. The lateral flaps of the mantle can completely hide the dorsum surface.

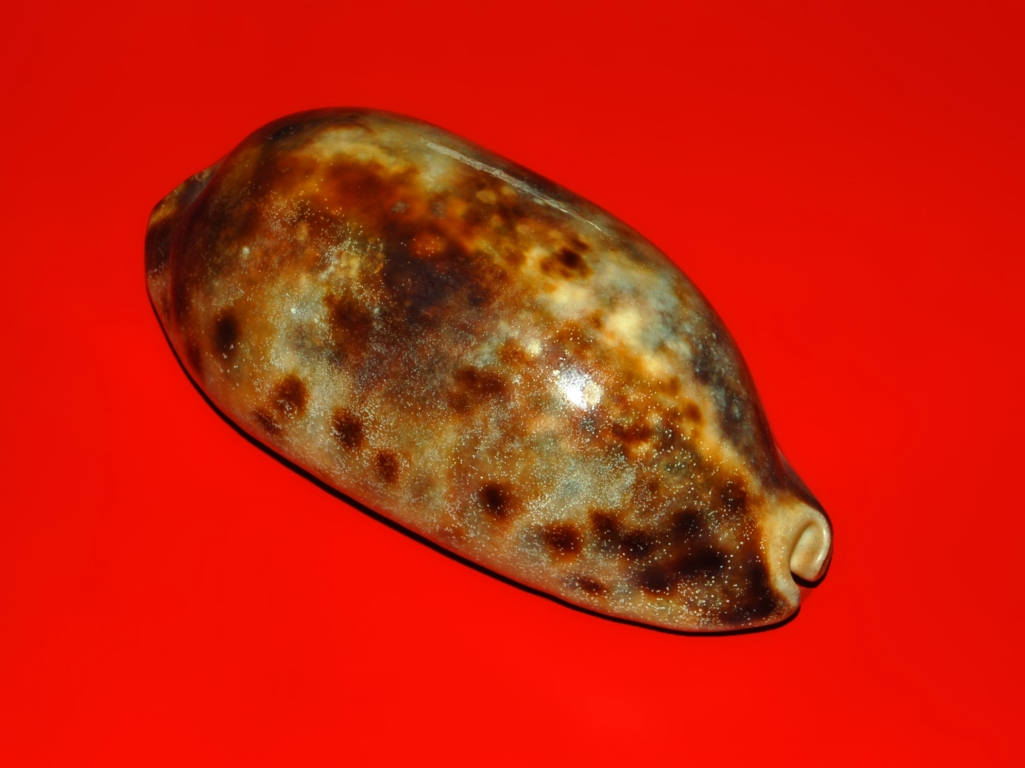
A shell of Chelycypraea testudinaria, dorsal view, anterior end towards the right

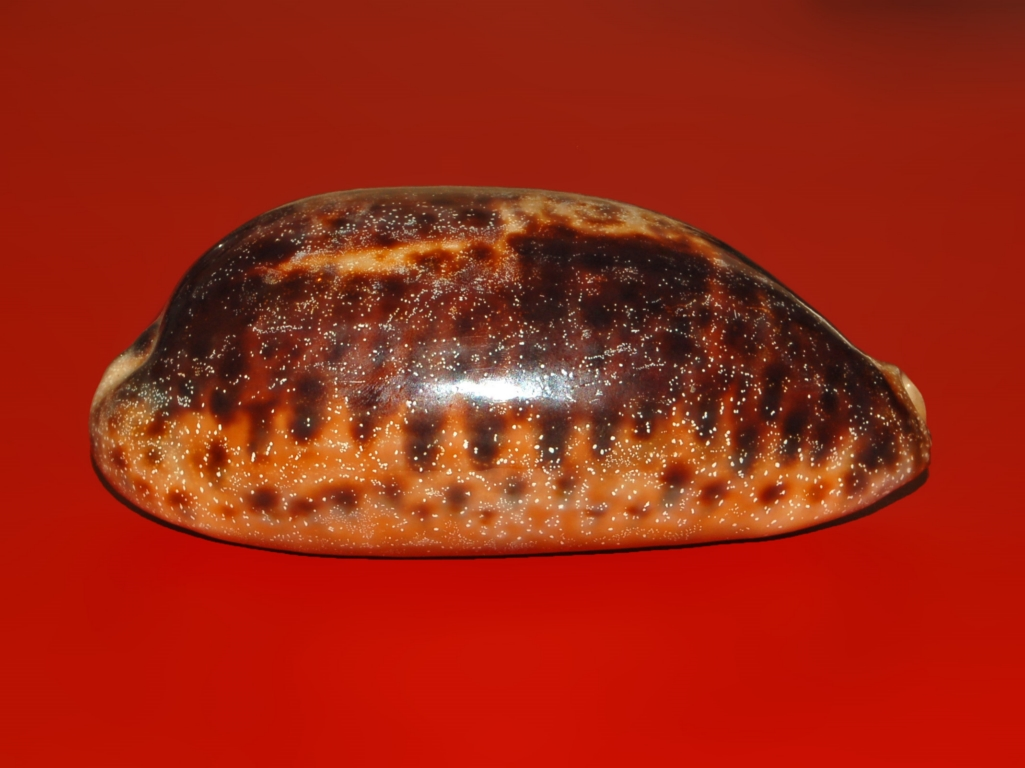
A shell of Chelycypraea testudinaria, lateral view, anterior end towards the right

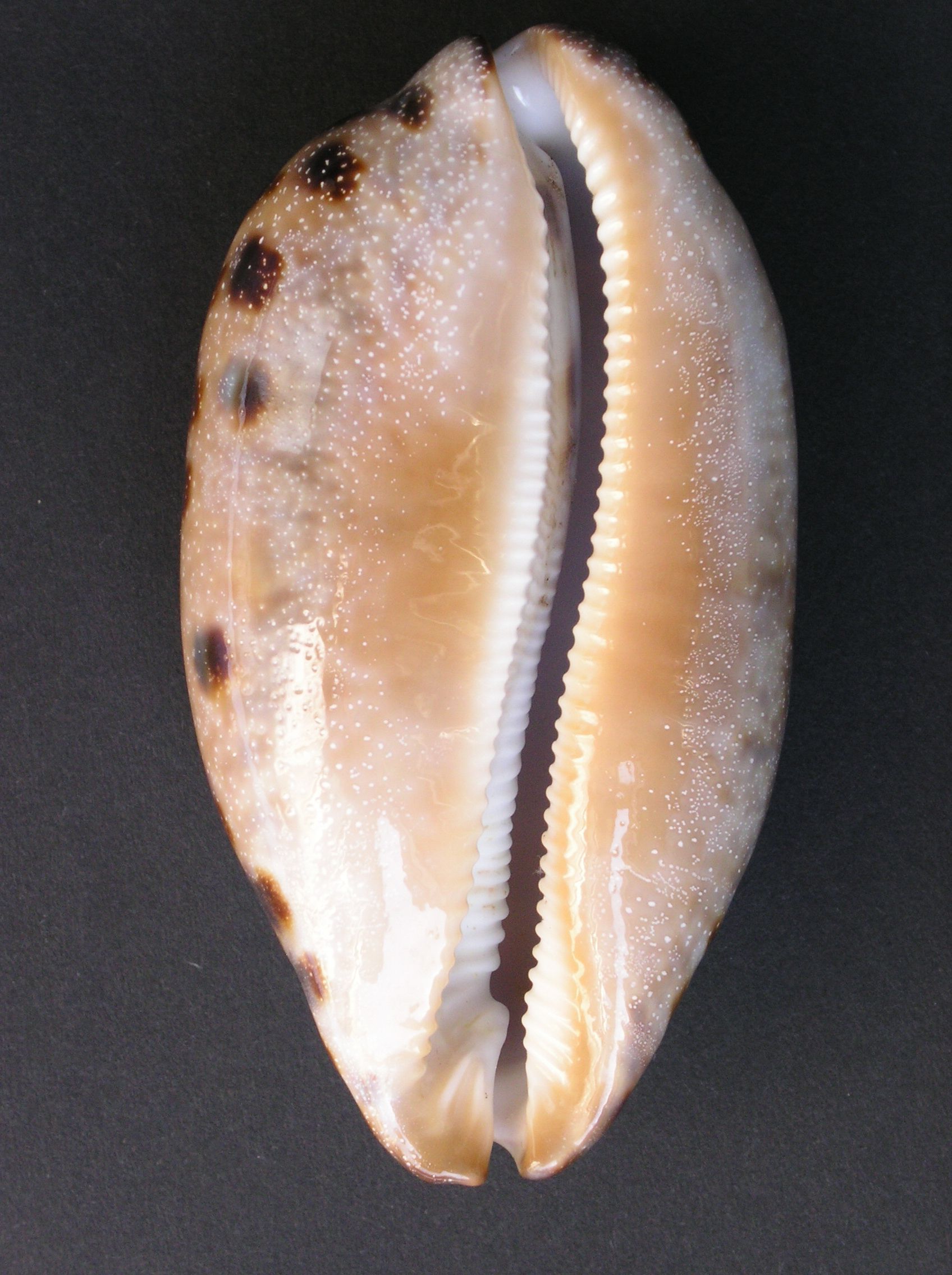
Ventral view of a shell of Chelycypraea testudinaria, anterior end towards the bottom

== Distribution ==
This species is distributed in the Indian Ocean and in the Pacific Ocean along Aldabra, Chagos, the Comores, Kenya, Madagascar, the Mascarene Basin, Mauritius, Mozambique, Réunion, the Seychelles, Zanzibar and Tanzania, Malaysia, Samar Island, Sulu Sea, Vietnam and Philippines (excluded Hawaii).

== Habitat ==
These cowries live on coral reef, in crevices and beneath large rocks in shallow subtidal waters at 5–15 metres (16–49 ft) of depth.
