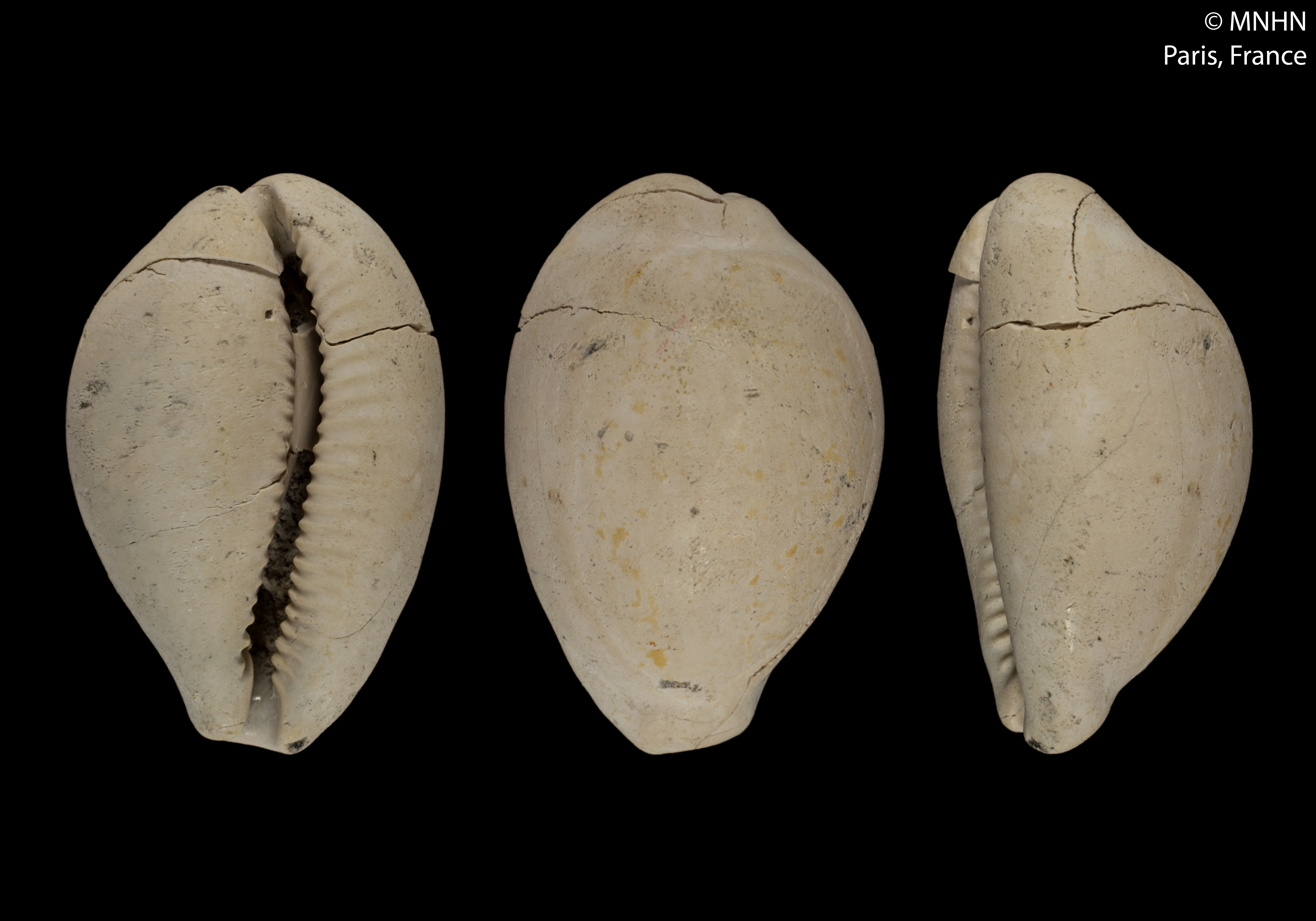
- Shell of † Proadusta camiadorum (holotype at MNHN, Paris)

Scientific classification
- Kingdom: Animalia
- Phylum: Mollusca
- Class: Gastropoda
- Subclass: Caenogastropoda
- Order: Littorinimorpha
- Superfamily: Cypraeoidea
- Family: Cypraeidae
- Genus: †Proadusta; Sacco, 1894

Type species
- † Cypraea (Proadusta) splendens var. denticulina Sacco, 1894

Synonyms
- † Cypraea (Proadusta) Sacco, 1894

= Proadusta =

Proadusta Temporal range: Oligocene - Miocene

Extinct genus of gastropods

Proadusta is an extinct genus of sea snail, a cowry, a marine gastropod mollusk in the subfamily Zonariinae of the family Cypraeidae, the cowries.

== Species ==
- † Proadusta camiadorum Dolin & Lozouet, 2004
- † Proadusta denticulina (Sacco, 1894)
- † Proadusta distinguenda (Schilder, 1927)
- † Proadusta distorta Dolin & Lozouet, 2004
- † Proadusta elliptica Dolin & Lozouet, 2004
- † Proadusta gemmosa Dolin & Lozouet, 2004
- † Proadusta goedertorum Groves & Squires, 1995
- † Proadusta inaequilabiata (Sacco, 1894)
- † Proadusta kamai (Beets, 1941)
- † Proadusta parvissima Dolin & Lozouet, 2004
- † Proadusta rostralina Dolin & Lozouet, 2004
- † Proadusta selatjauensis (F. A. Schilder, 1932)
- † Proadusta splendens (Grateloup, 1827)
- † Proadusta subinflata (d'Orbigny, 1852)
- † Proadusta truncata (Bronn, 1831)

Synonyms

- † Proadusta francki Gain, Le Renard & Belliard, 2012: synonym of † Romanekia francki (Gain, Le Renard & Belliard, 2012) (original combination)
