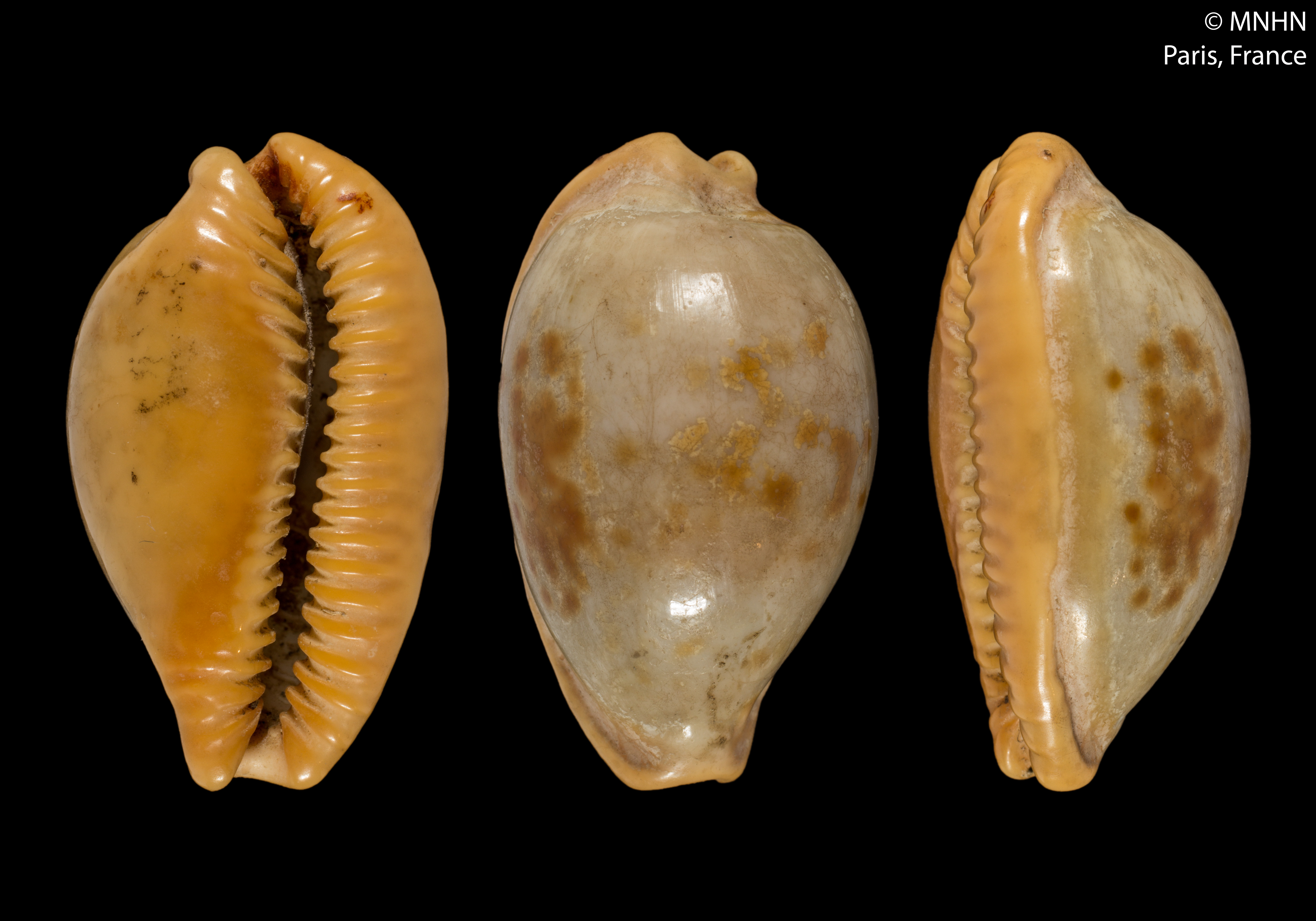
- Shell of Propustularia surinamensis

Scientific classification
- Kingdom: Animalia
- Phylum: Mollusca
- Class: Gastropoda
- Subclass: Caenogastropoda
- Order: Littorinimorpha
- Superfamily: Cypraeoidea
- Family: Cypraeidae
- Genus: Propustularia; Schilder, 1927

Type species
- Cypraea surinamensis Perry, 1811

Synonyms
- † Conocypraea Oppenheim, 1901; † Cypraea (Conocypraea) Oppenheim, 1901; † Pustularia (Conocypraea) Oppenheim, 1901; Pustularia (Propustularia) Schilder, 1927 (original rank)

= Propustularia =

Genus of molluscs

Propustularia is a genus of sea snails, marine gastropod mollusks in the subfamily Erosariinae of the family Cypraeidae, the cowries.

== Species ==
Species within the genus Propustularia include:

- † Propustularia renardi Dolin, 1998
- Propustularia surinamensis (Perry, 1811)
