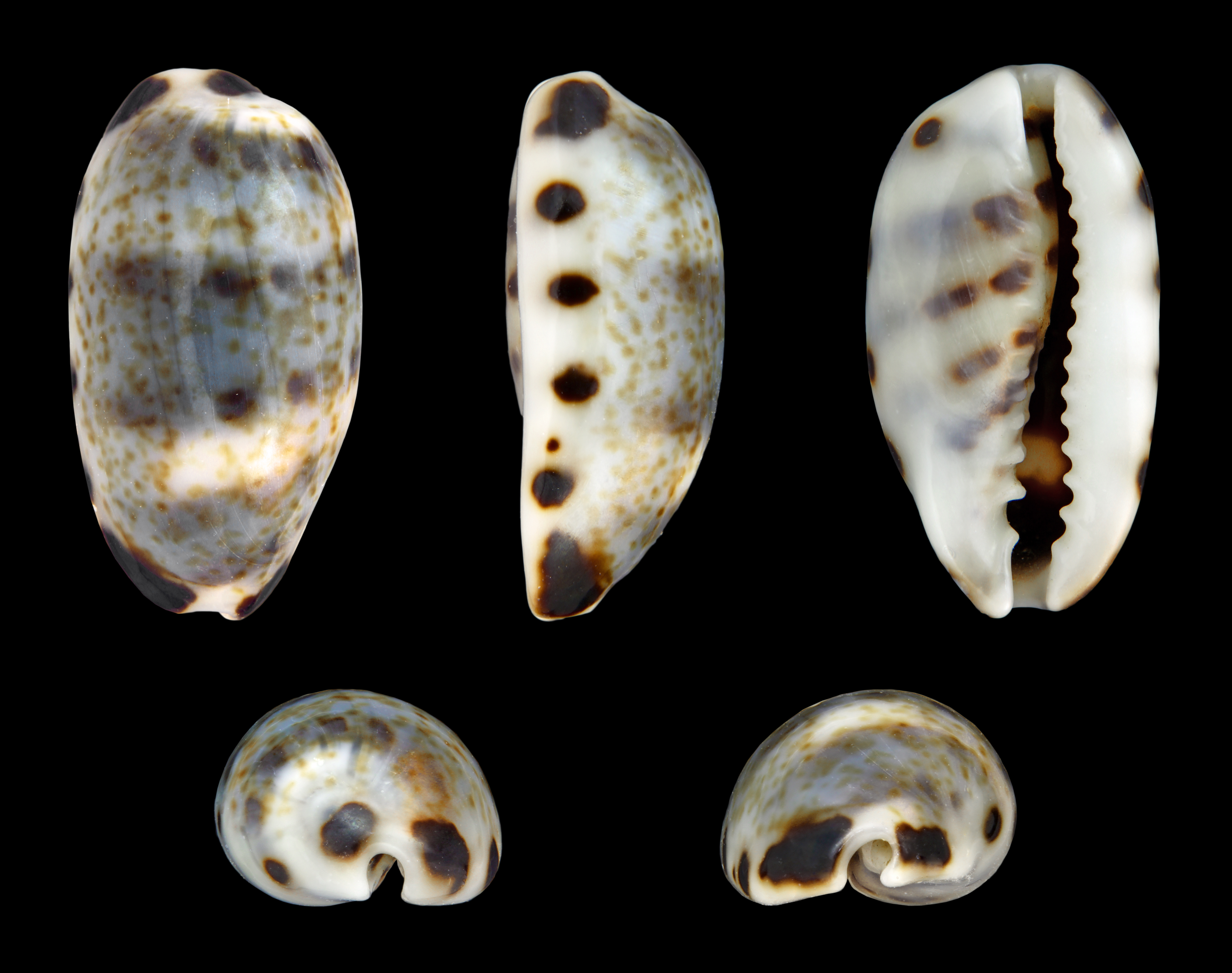
- Melicerona listeri listeri

Scientific classification
- Kingdom: Animalia
- Phylum: Mollusca
- Class: Gastropoda
- Subclass: Caenogastropoda
- Order: Littorinimorpha
- Family: Cypraeidae
- Genus: Melicerona; Iredale, 1930

= Melicerona =

Genus of gastropods

Melicerona is a genus of sea snails, marine gastropod mollusks in the family Cypraeidae, the cowries.

== Species ==
Species within the genus Melicerona include:

- Melicerona felina (Gmelin, 1791)
- Melicerona listeri (Bouchet & Rocroi, 2005)
