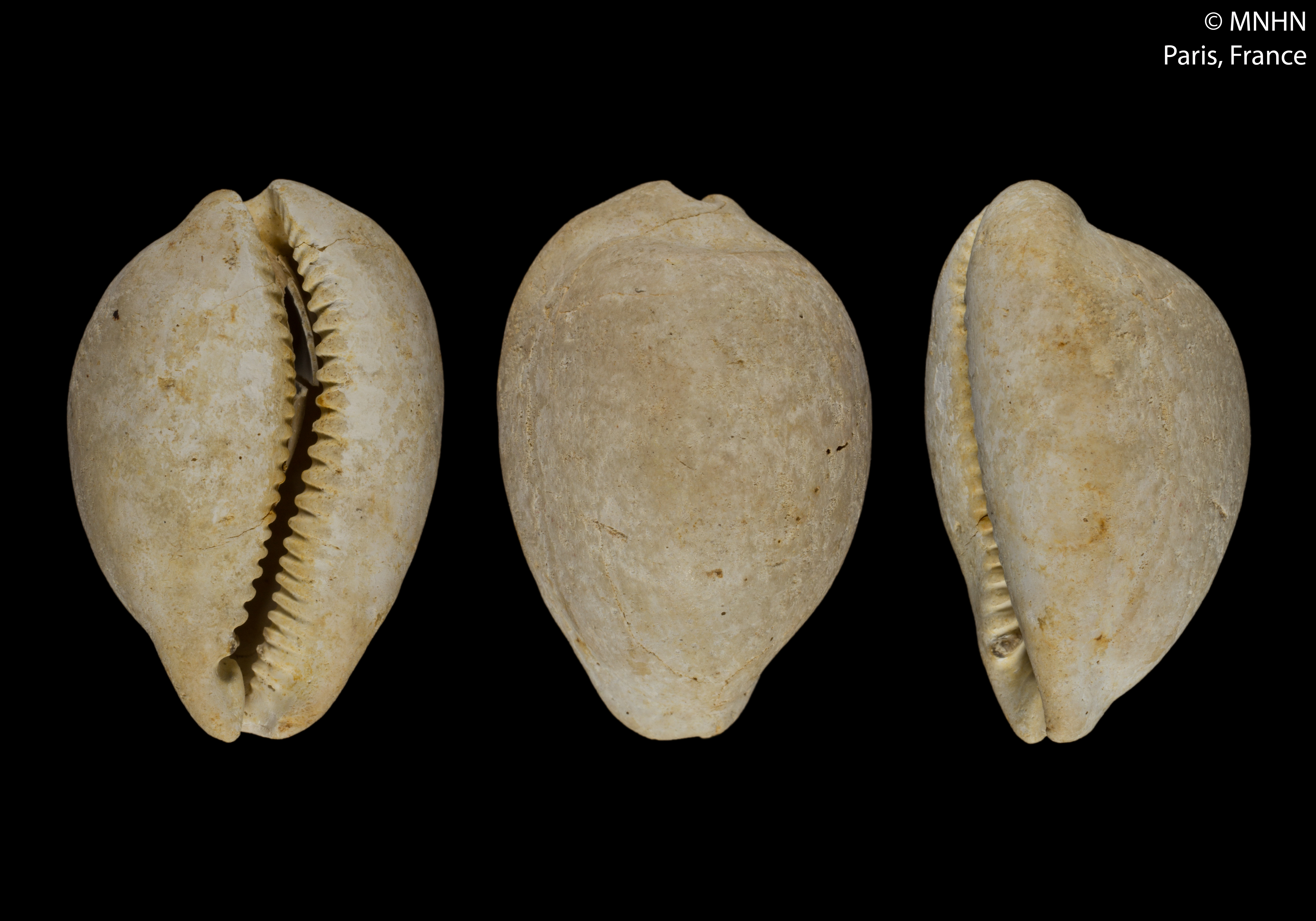
- Shell of Cypraeorbis gaasensis (holotype at MNHN, Paris)

Scientific classification
- Kingdom: Animalia
- Phylum: Mollusca
- Class: Gastropoda
- Subclass: Caenogastropoda
- Order: Littorinimorpha
- Superfamily: Cypraeoidea
- Family: Cypraeidae
- Genus: †Cypraeorbis; Conrad, 1865

Type species
- † Cypraea sphaeroides Conrad, 1848

Synonyms
- † Cypraea (Cypraeorbis) Conrad, 1865 (original rank)

= Cypraeorbis =

Extinct genus of gastropods

Cypraeorbis is an extinct genus of sea snails, marine gastropod mollusks in the subfamily Cypraeinae of the family Cypraeidae.

== Species ==
Species within the genus Cypraeorbis include:

- † Cypraeorbis gaasensis Dolin & Lozouet, 2004
- † Cypraeorbis sphaeroides (Conrad, 1848)
- † Cypraeorbis vesicularis Dolin & Lozouet, 2004

Species brought into synonymy

- † Cypraeorbis emilyae Dolin, 1991 : synonymù of † Loxacypraea emilyae (Dolin, 1991) † (original combination)
