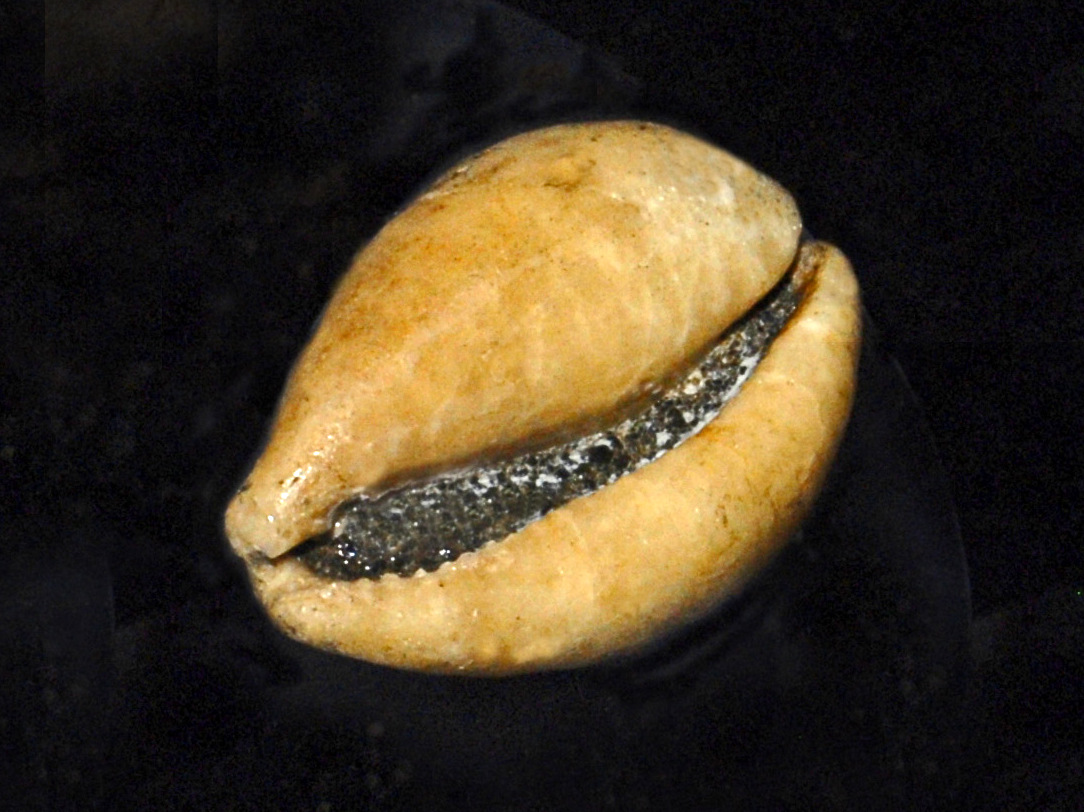
- Fossil of Miolyncina conjungens

Scientific classification
- Kingdom: Animalia
- Phylum: Mollusca
- Class: Gastropoda
- Subclass: Caenogastropoda
- Order: Littorinimorpha
- Family: Cypraeidae
- Genus: †Miolyncina; Schilder, 1932

= Miolyncina =

Miolyncina Temporal range: Eocene - Pliocene

Extinct genus of gastropods

Miolyncina is an extinct genus of sea snail, a cowry, a marine gastropod mollusk in the family Cypraeidae, the cowries.

== Fossil record ==
Fossils of Miolyncina are found in marine strata from the Eocene to the Pliocene (age range: from 48.6 to 2.588 million years ago.). Fossils are known from Italy, France, India, Pakistan, Poland and Sri Lanka.

== Species ==
- †Miolyncina cocconii Mayer-Eymar 1875
- †Miolyncina conjungens Sacco 1894
- †Miolyncina margaritaria Dovesi & Lorenz 2024
- †Miolyncina prevostina Grateloup 1847
