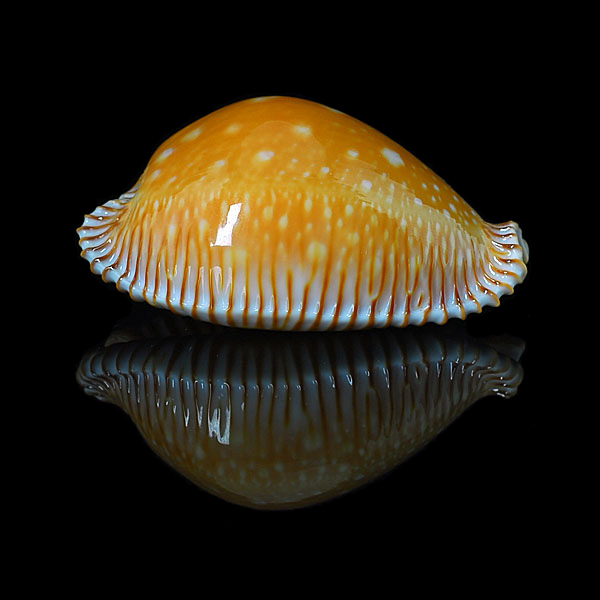
- Lateral view of a shell of Perisserosa guttata

Scientific classification
- Kingdom: Animalia
- Phylum: Mollusca
- Class: Gastropoda
- Subclass: Caenogastropoda
- Order: Littorinimorpha
- Family: Cypraeidae
- Genus: Perisserosa; Iredale, 1930

Type species
- Cypraea guttata Gmelin, 1791

= Perisserosa =

Genus of gastropods

Perisserosa is a genus of sea snails, cowries, marine gastropod mollusks in the family Cypraeidae, the cowries.

== Species ==
Species within the genus Perisserosa include:

- Perisserosa guttata (Gmelin, 1791)

Synonyms=

- Perisserosa brocktoni Iredale, 1930: synonym of Perisserosa guttata (Gmelin, 1791)
