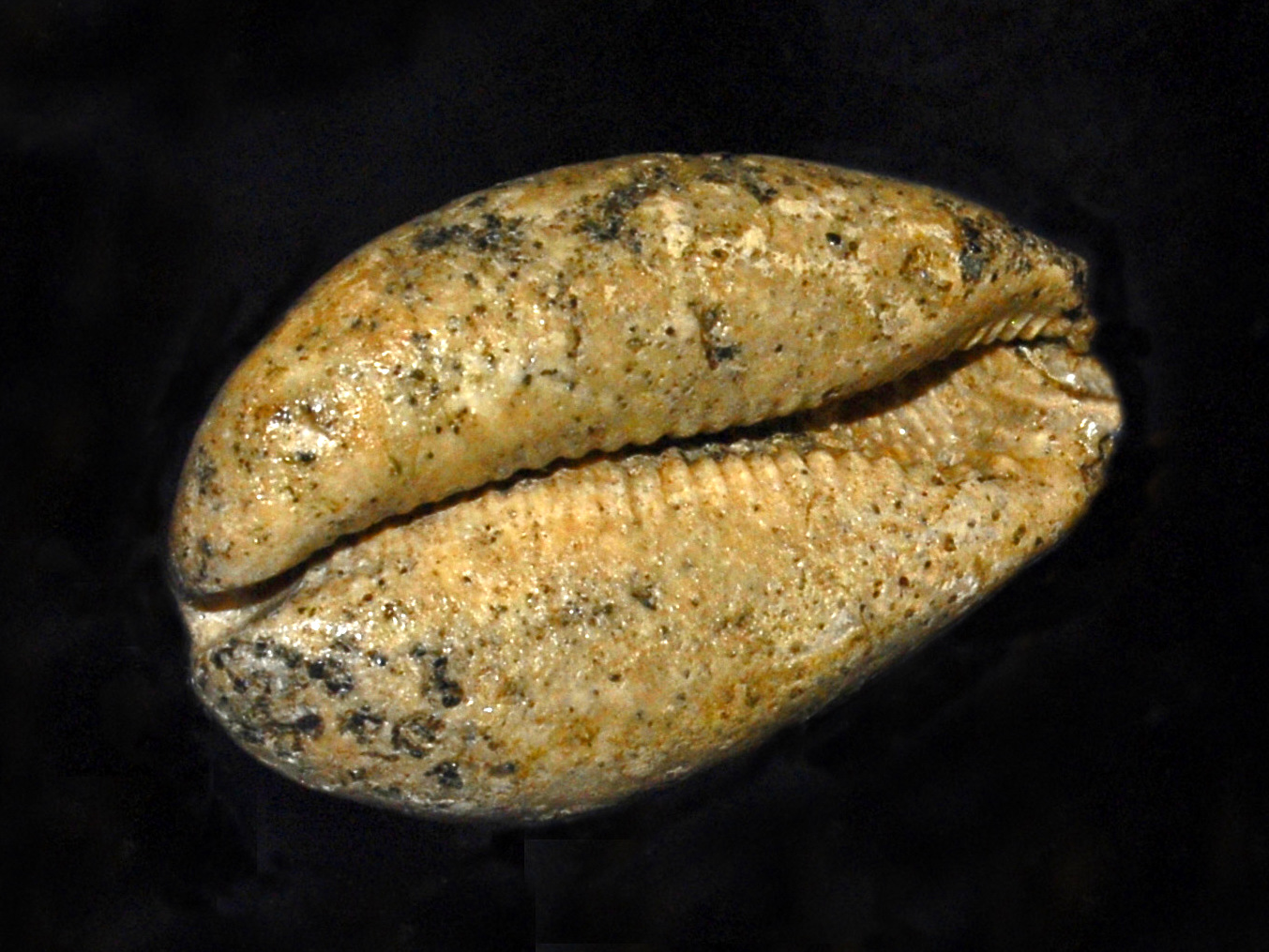
- Fossil shell of Prozonarina fabagina

Scientific classification
- Kingdom: Animalia
- Phylum: Mollusca
- Class: Gastropoda
- Subclass: Caenogastropoda
- Order: Littorinimorpha
- Superfamily: Cypraeoidea
- Family: Cypraeidae
- Genus: †Prozonarina; Schilder, 1941

Type species
- † Cypraea brocchii Deshayes, 1844

Synonyms
- † Zonarina (Prozonarina) Schilder, 1941 (original rank)

= Prozonarina =

Prozonarina Temporal range: Oligocene - Miocene

Extinct genus of gastropods

Prozonarina is an extinct genus of sea snail, a cowry, a marine gastropod mollusk in the subfamily Zonariinae of the family Cypraeidae, the cowries.

== Fossil record ==
Fossils of Prozonarina are found in marine strata from the Oligocene to the Miocene (from 23.03 to 5.332 million years ago). Fossils are known from Italy, France, Italy, Malta, Poland, Romania, Turkey and Greece.

== Species ==
- †Prozonarina barcamorpha Dolin and Lozouet, 2004
- †Prozonarina brocchii Deshayes, 1844
- †Prozonarina expansa Grateloup, 1847
- †Prozonarina fabagina Lamarck, 1810
- †Prozonarina haueriana Dolin and Lozouet, 2004
- †Prozonarina maxima Grateloup, 1847
- † Prozonarina mineurensis Dolin & Lozouet, 2004
- † Prozonarina nigricans Dolin & Lozouet, 2004
- †Prozonarina regalis Dolin and Lozouet, 2004
