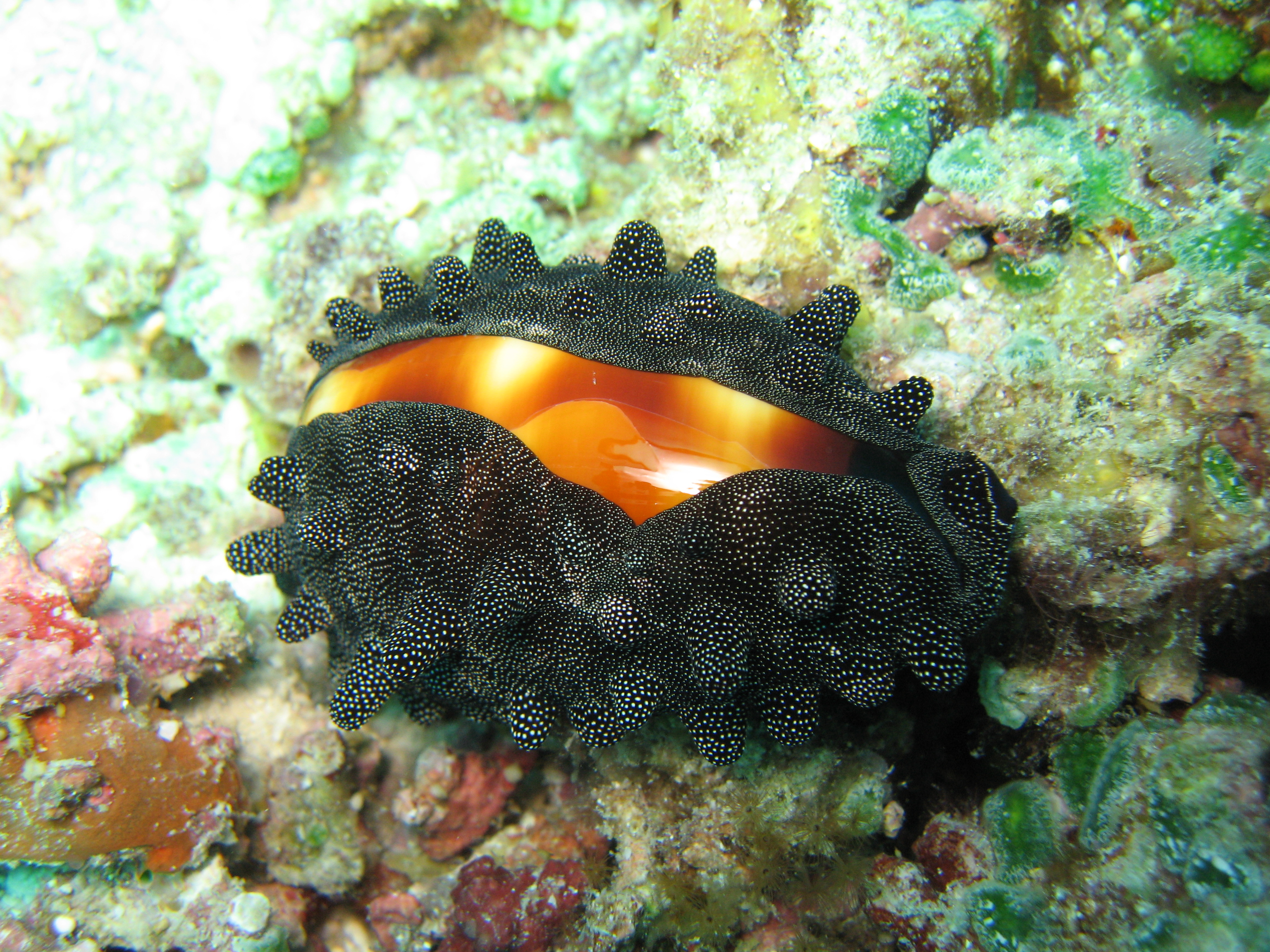
- A live Talparia talpa in situ with its mantle almost fully extended, anterior end towards the right
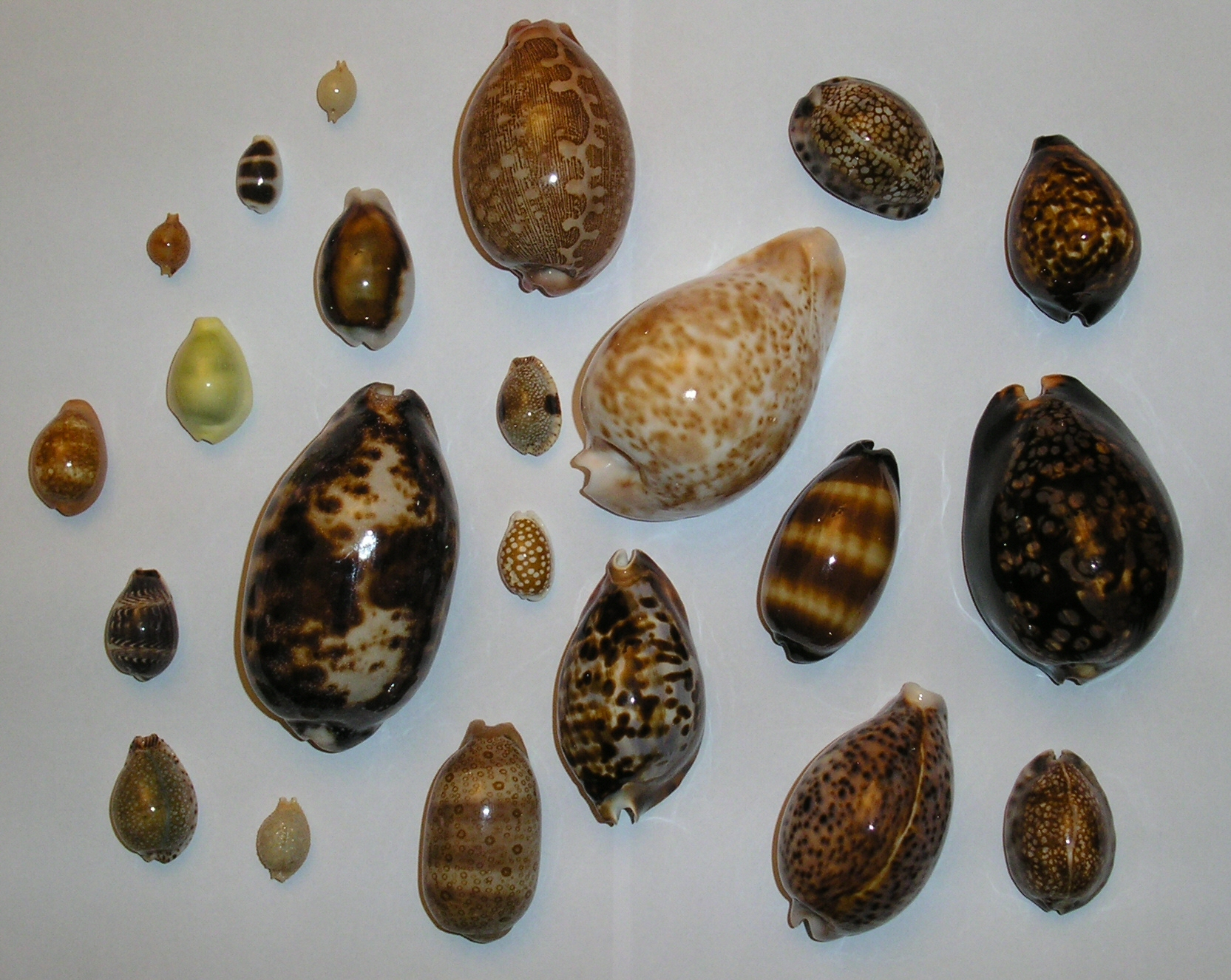
- Shells of a number of species of cowries

Scientific classification
- Kingdom: Animalia
- Phylum: Mollusca
- Class: Gastropoda
- Subclass: Caenogastropoda
- Order: Littorinimorpha
- Superfamily: Cypraeoidea
- Family: Cypraeidae; Rafinesque, 1815

Type genus
- Pseudomelatoma Dall, 1918

Genera
- See text

Synonyms
- Cypraeovulinae Schilder, 1927· accepted, alternate representation; Erroneinae Schilder, 1927· accepted, alternate representation; Luriinae Schilder, 1932· accepted, alternate representation; Pustulariinae Gill, 1871· accepted, alternate representation

= Cypraeidae =

Family of gastropods

Cypraeidae, commonly named the cowries (sing. cowry or cowrie), is a taxonomic family of small to large sea snails. These are marine gastropod mollusks in the superfamily Cypraeoidea, the cowries and cowry allies.

== Shell description ==
Cypraeidae have adult shells which are very rounded, almost like an egg; they do not look like a typical gastropod shell. Their glossy, polished, ovate-shaped shells have beautiful patterns in a variety of colors. These patterns, combined with minor variations in shell form, have led some conchologists to recognize 60 genera and hundreds of species and subspecies.

In virtually all of the species in the family Cypraeidae, the shells are extremely smooth and shiny. This is because in the living animal, the shell is often partially and sometimes fully covered with the mantle.

There is great diversity: https://www.youtube.com/watch?v=VqLxbfoEIaI

The upper surface is typically convex, while the ventral side is flattened. Typically, no spire is visible in the fully adult shell. There is a long, narrow, aperture that runs along the length of the ventral side. The aperture is lined with "teeth".

Juvenile cowry shells are not at all similar to adult cowry shells. The juvenile shells of cowries perhaps more closely resemble the shells of some "bubble snails" in the order Cephalaspidea. Also the shells of juvenile cowries seldom exhibit the same color patterns as the adult shells do, and thus can be hard to identify to species.

Cowries have no operculum.

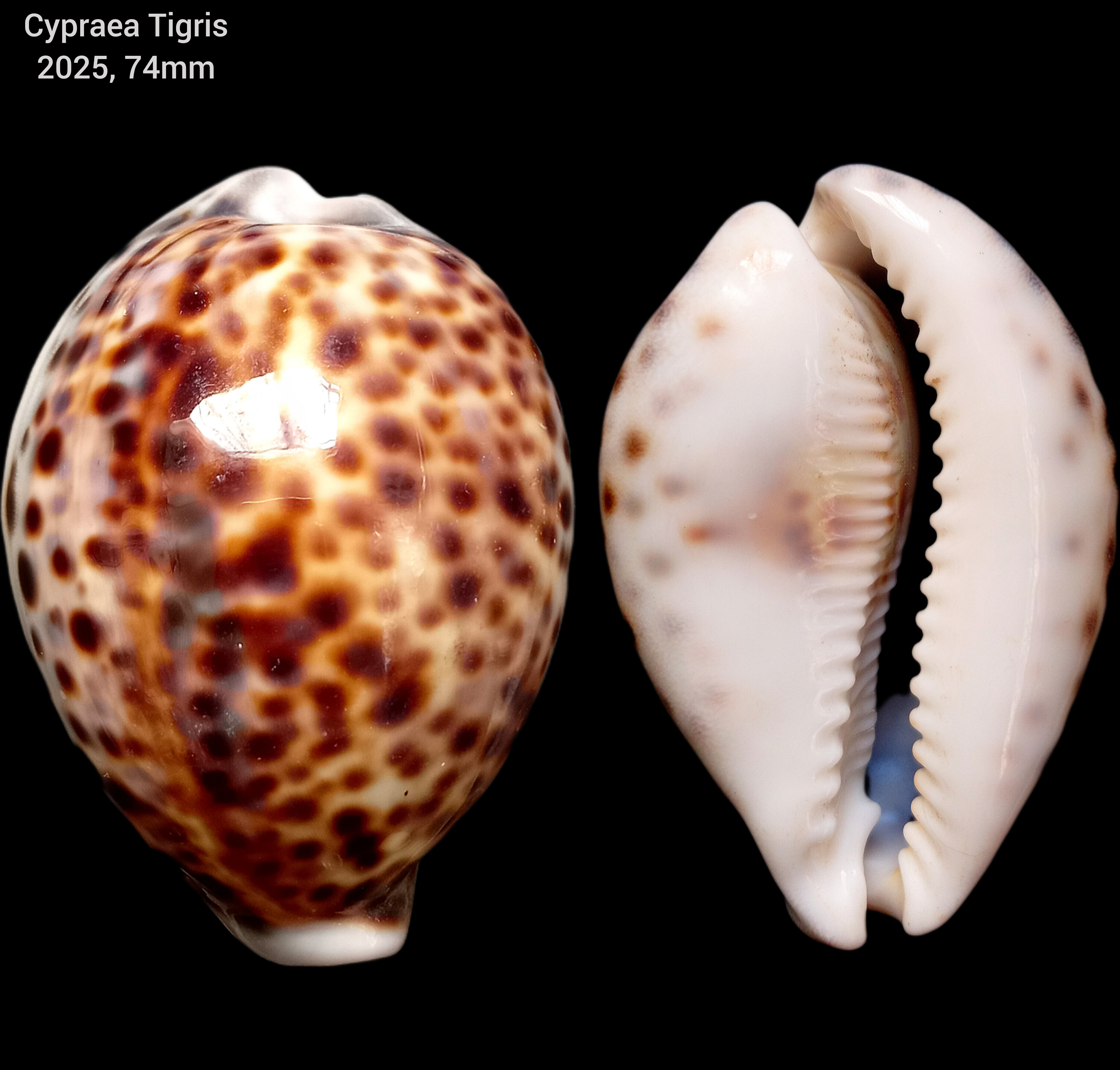
Cypraea tigris

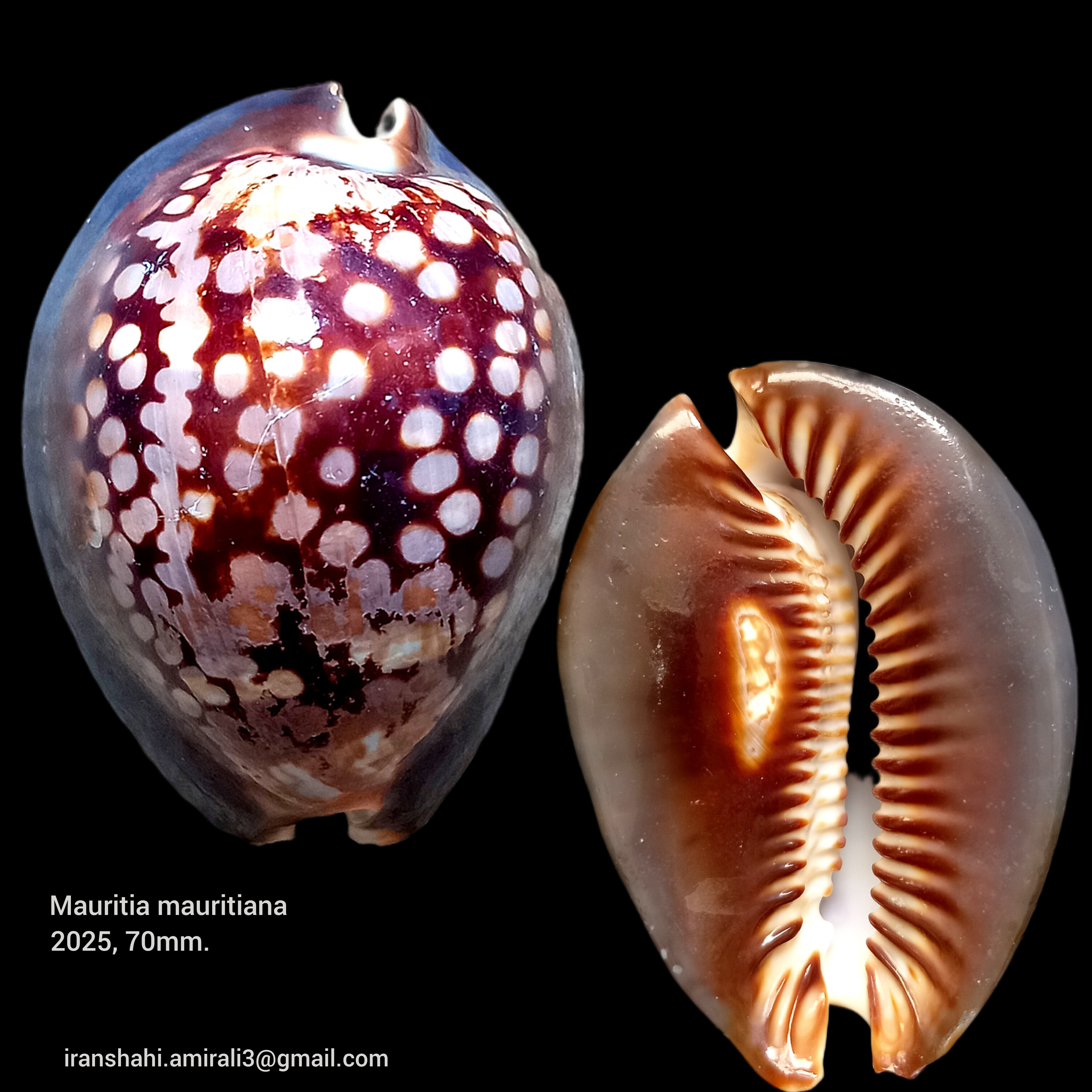
Mauritia mauritiana

== Distribution ==
The Cypraeidae constitute one of the most widely distributed groups of gastropods in tropical and subtropical seas. The cowries are one of the most abundant and diversified groups of shells to be found on reefs and rocky intertidal flats and sandy substrates in the island area.

== Predators and prey ==
The very narrow toothed aperture of the cowry shell makes the adult shells difficult for many predators to reach into. However cowries are still vulnerable to predation:

- Some tropical crustaceans can break the dorsum of a cowry shell.
- Some mollusc-eating cones, such as Conus textile, can inject venom into the cowry's flesh. The cone then extends its stomach into the shell, through the aperture, to completely ingest the flesh.
- Some octopuses can gouge a small hole (using a special barb/tooth and an acidic secretion) through the shell to inject a venom that kills the animal within.

The eating habits of cowries are poorly known, because most species are nocturnal and cryptic, but sponges are the most commonly described prey. Off the coasts of Australia, common cowry species eat sponges, and on Caribbean coral reefs they are known to eat sponges that are otherwise chemically defended against other predators.

== Taxonomy ==
For nearly 200 years, every species in the family Cypraeidae was placed in one genus, Cypraea, but in 2002 the cowries were divided into many different genera.

=== 2005 taxonomy ===
The family Cypraeidae belongs, together with the family Ovulidae, to the superfamily Cypraeoidea. This, in turn, is part of the clade Littorinimorpha which belongs within the clade Hypsogastropoda according to the taxonomy of Bouchet & Rocroi (2005).

The following six subfamilies have been recognized in the taxonomy of Bouchet & Rocroi (2005) but are treated as alternate representation of Cypraeidae in the World Register of Marine Species :

- Cypraeinae Rafinesque, 1815
  - tribe Cypraeini Rafinesque, 1815 - synonym: Porcellanidae Roberts, 1870 (inv.)
  - tribe Mauritiini Steadman & Cotton, 1946
- Erosariinae Schilder, 1924 - synonyms: Cypraeacitinae Schilder, 1930 (inv.); Nariinae Schilder, 1932; Staphylaeinae Iredale, 1935
- Erroneinae Schilder, 1927
  - tribe Erroneini Schilder, 1927 - synonym: Adustinae Steadman & Cotton, 1946
  - tribe Bistolidini C. Meyer, 2003
- Gisortiinae Schilder, 1927 - synonyms: Archicypraeinae Schilder, 1930; Bernayinae Schilder, 1927; Cpraeorbini Schilder, 1927; Mandolininae Schilder, 1932; Umbiliini Schilder 1932; Zoilinae Iredale, 1935
- Luriinae Schilder, 1932
  - tribe Luriini Schilder, 1932 - synonym: Talpariinae Iredale, 1935
  - tribe Austrocypraeini Iredale, 1935
- Pustulariinae Gill, 1871
  - tribe Pustulariini Gill, 1871
  - tribe Cypraeovulini Schilder, 1927
- Zonariinae F. A. Schilder, 1932
  - Tribe Pseudozonariini Lopez Soriano, 2006
  - tribe Zonariini Schilder, 1932

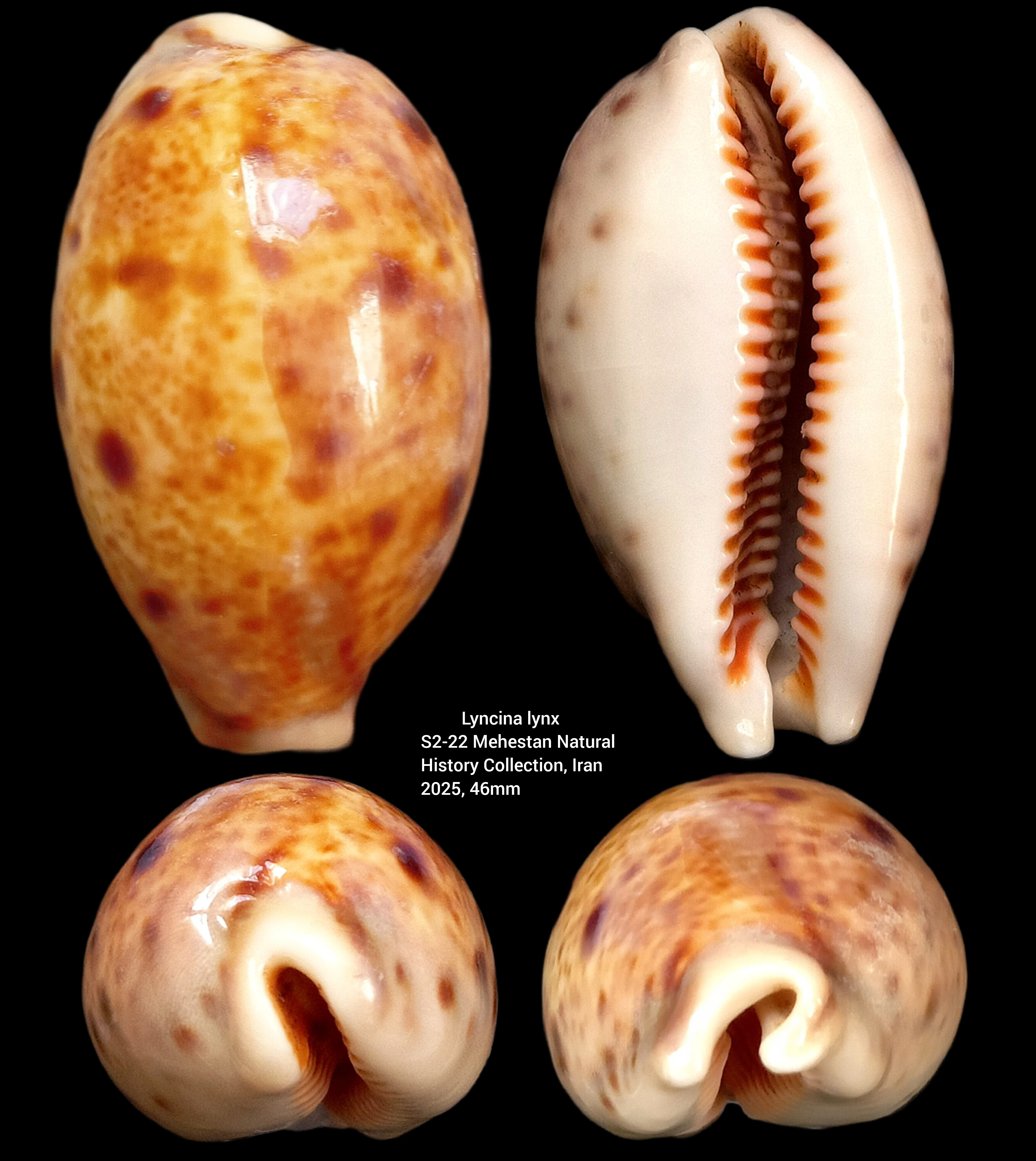
Lyncina lynx S2-22 46mm

== Genera ==
Genera within the family Cypraeidae include:

- Subfamily Cypraeinae Rafinesque, 1815
  - Cypraea Linnaeus, 1758
  - † Cypraeorbis Timothy Abbott Conrad, 1865
  - Muracypraea Woodring, 1957
  - † Siphocypraea Heilprin, 1887

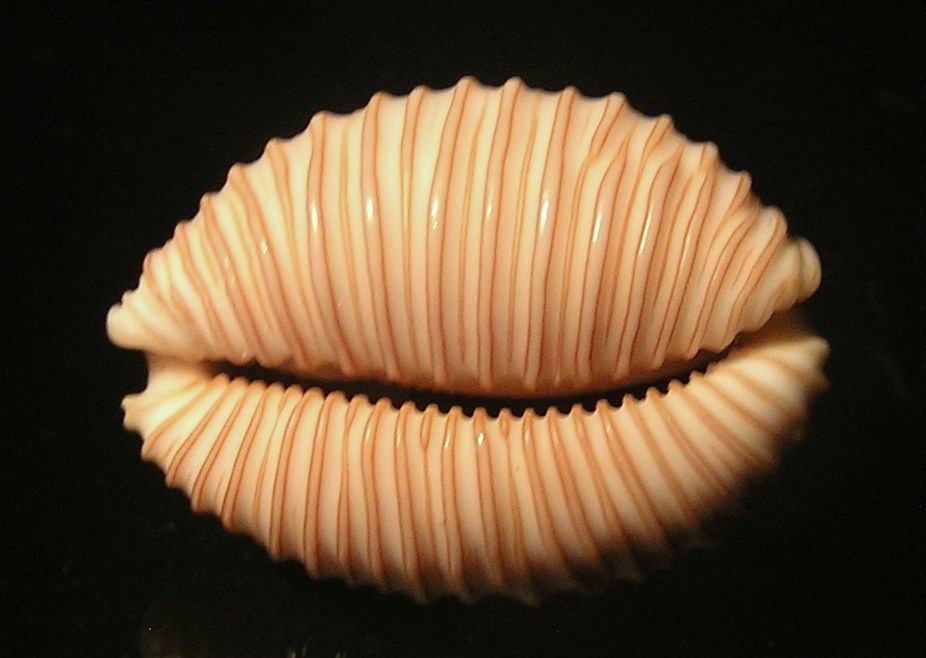
Apertural view of a shell of Nucleolaria granulata

- Subfamily Erosariinae Schilder, 1924
  - Cryptocypraea Meyer, 2003
  - Ipsa Jousseaume, 1884
  - Monetaria Troschel, 1863
  - Naria Gray, 1837
  - Nesiocypraea Azuma & Kurohara, 1967
  - Nucleolaria Oyama, 1959
  - † Palaeocypraea Schilder, 1928
  - Perisserosa Iredale, 1930
  - † Praerosaria Dolin & Lozouet, 2004
  - Propustularia Schilder, 1927
  - Staphylaea Jousseaume, 1884
  - † Subepona Dolin & Lozouet, 2004
- Subfamily Erroneinae Schilder, 1927
  - Bistolida Cossmann, 1920
  - Erronea Troschel, 1863

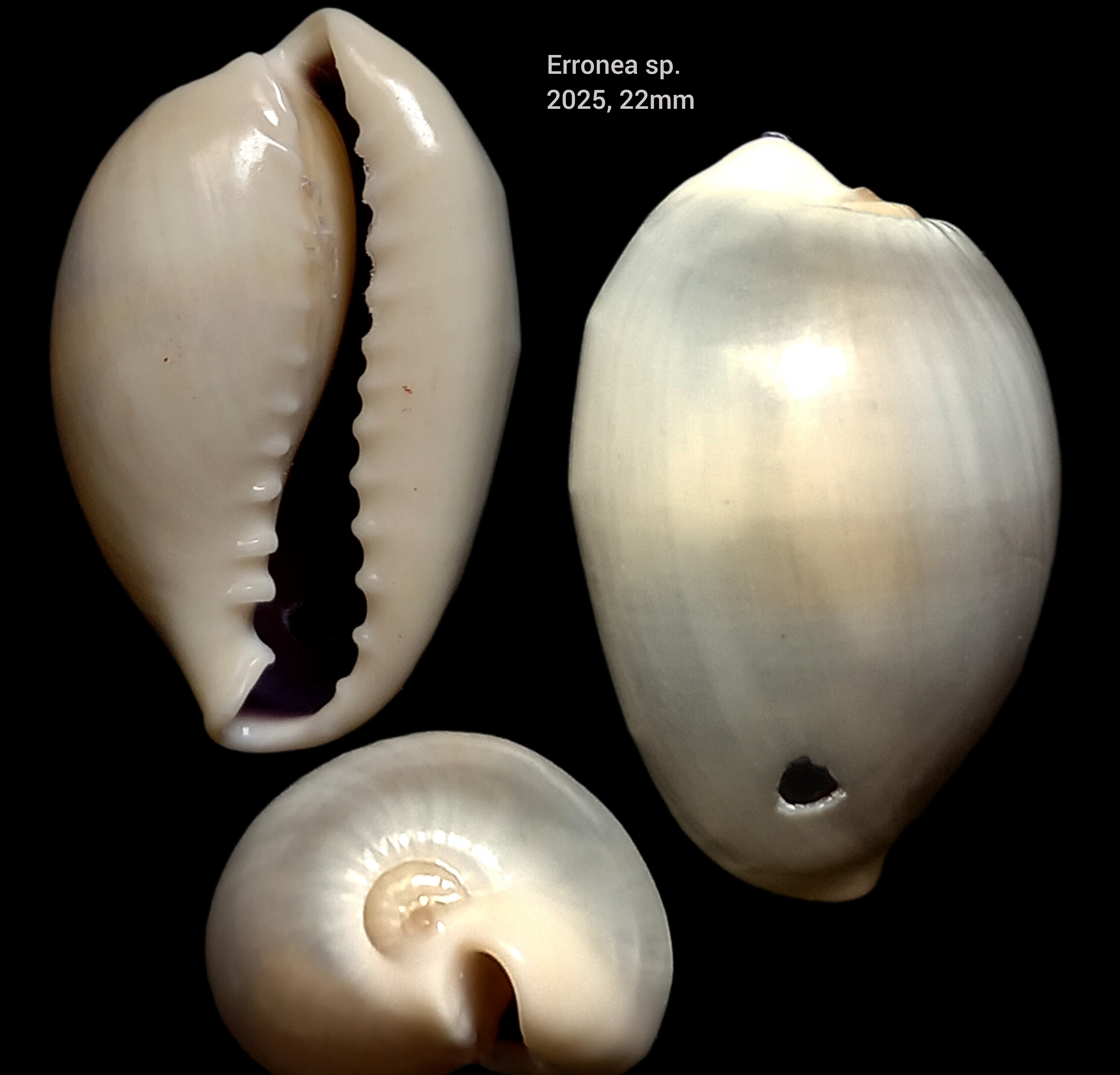
Erronea sp

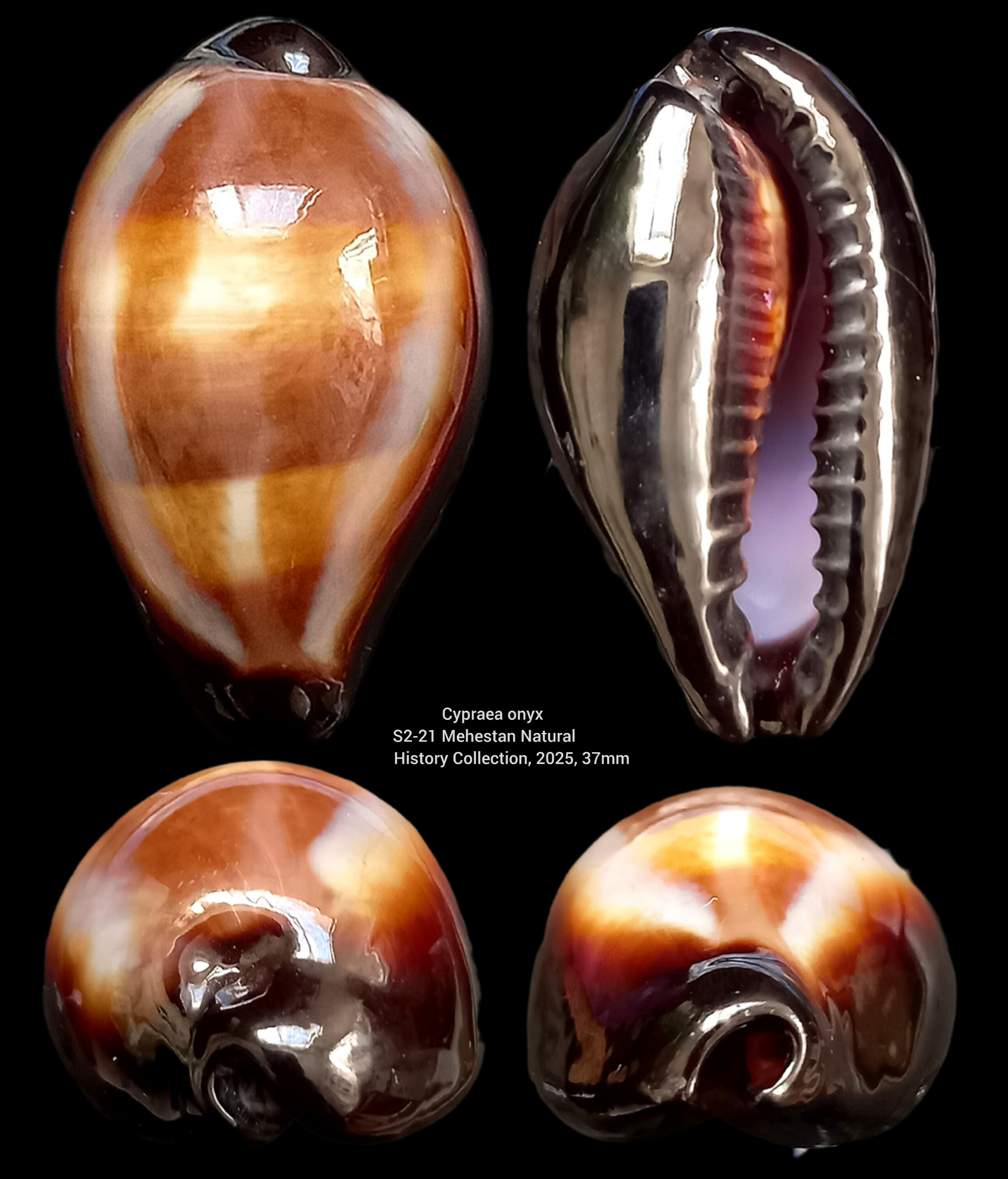
Erronea onyx S2-21 37mm

- Subfamily † Gisortiinae Schilder, 1927
  - † Afrocypraea Schilder, 1932
  - † Archicypraea Schilder, 1926
  - † Bernaya Jousseaume, 1884
  - † Garviea Dolin & Dockery, 2018
  - † Gisortia Jousseaume, 1884
  - † Mandolina Jousseaume, 1884
  - † Protocypraea Schilder, 1927
  - † Semicypraea Schilder, 1927
  - † Vicetia Fabiani 1905
- Subfamily Luriinae Schilder, 1932
- Tribe Austrocypraeini Iredale, 1935
  - Annepona Iredale, 1935
  - Arestorides Iredale 1930
  - Austrocypraea Cossmann, 1903
  - Callistocypraea Schilder, 1927
  - Chelycypraea Schilder, 1927
  - Lyncina Troschel, 1863
  - Raybaudia Lorenz, 2017
  - Trona Jousseaume, 1884
- Tribe Luriini Schilder, 1932
  - † Fossacypraea Schilder, 1939
  - † Jousseaumia Sacco, 1894
  - Luria Jousseaume, 1884
  - Talparia Troschel, 1863
- Subfamily Pustulariinae Gill, 1871
  - Cypraeovula Gray, 1824
  - Pustularia Swainson, 1840

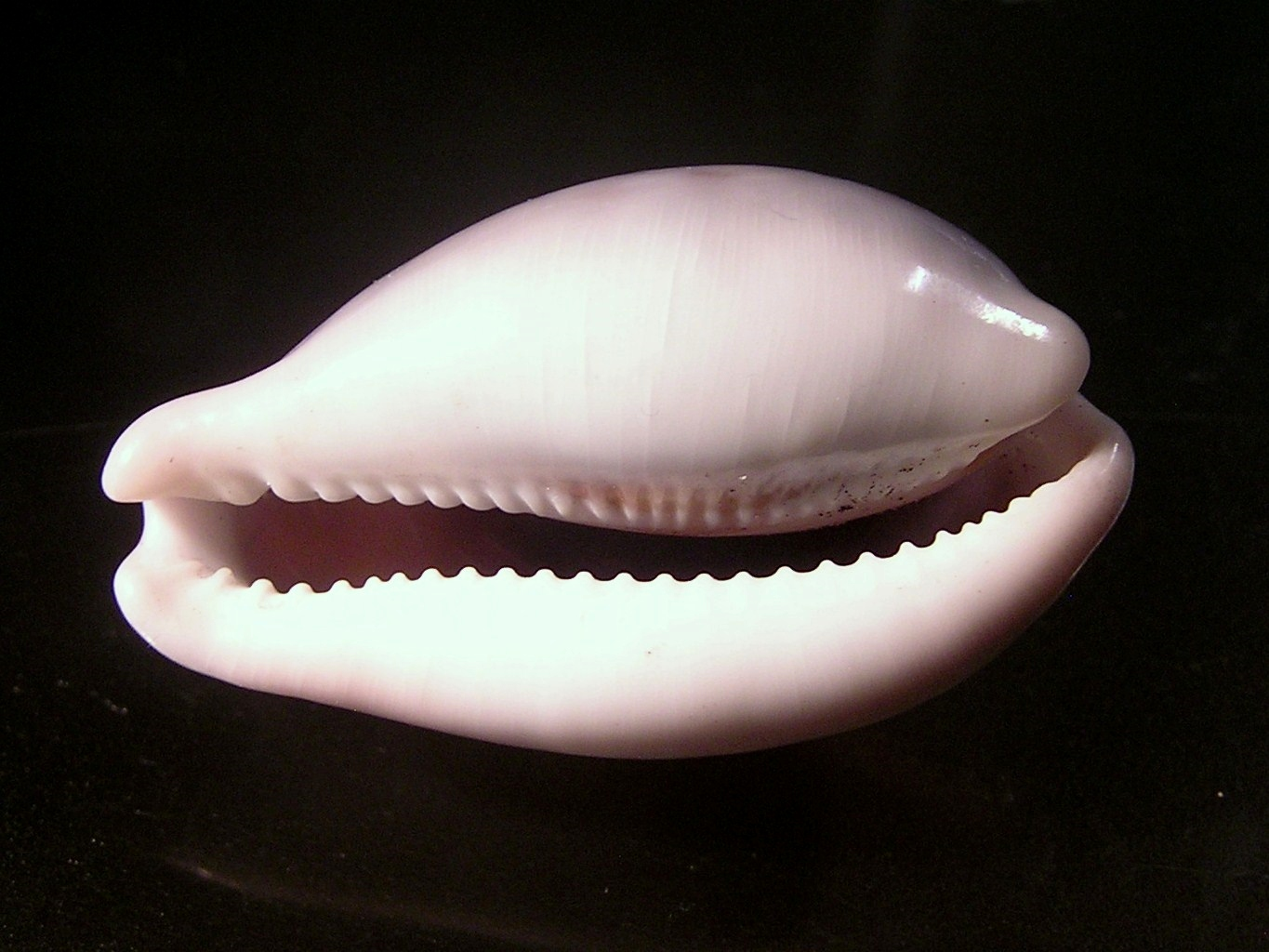
Neobernaya spadicea

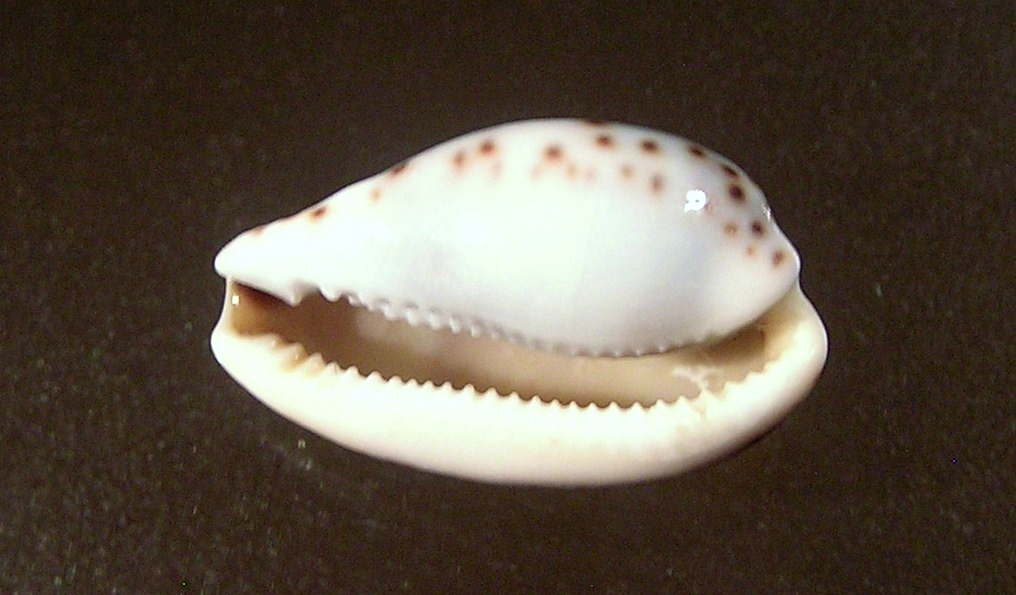
Notocypraea piperita

- Subfamily Umbiliinae Schilder, 1932
  - † Gigantocypraea Schilder, 1927
  - Umbilia Jousseaume, 1884

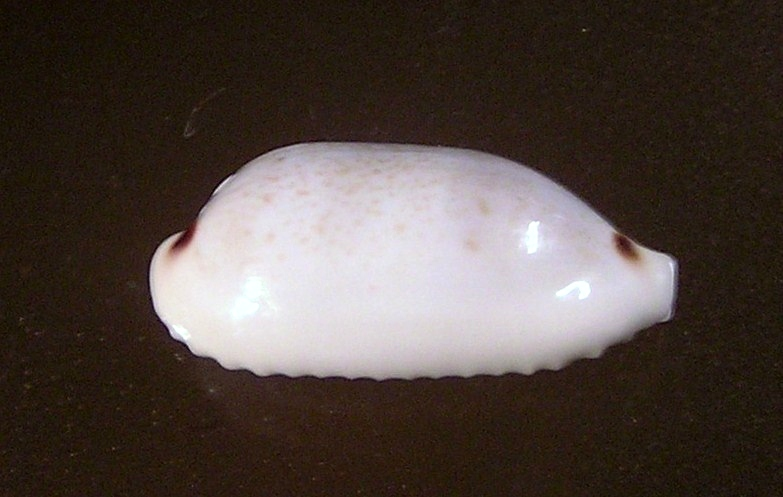
Eclogavena quadrimaculata thielei

- Subfamily Zonariinae F. A. Schilder, 1932
  - Tribe Pseudozonariini Lopez Soriano, 2006
    - Neobernaya Schilder 1927
    - Pseudozonaria Schilder, 1929
    - Plaziatia Dolin & Lozouet, 2004 accepted as Pseudozonaria Schilder, 1929
  - tribe Zonariini Schilder, 1932
    - Proadusta Sacco, 1894 †
    - Prozonarina Schilder, 1941 †
    - Schilderina Dolin & Aguerre, 2020
    - Zonaria Jousseaume, 1884
    - † Zonarina Sacco, 1894
      - Schilderia Tomlin, 1930
- Not assigned to a subfamily
  - Austrasiatica Lorenz, 1989
  - Barycypraea Schilder, 1927
  - Blasicrura Iredale, 1930
  - Contradusta Meyer, 2003
  - Cribrarula Strand, 1929
  - Eclogavena Iredale, 1930
  - Ficadusta Habe & Kosuge 1966
  - Leporicypraea Iredale, 1930
  - Macrocypraea Schilder, 1930
  - Mauritia Troschel, 1863
  - Melicerona Iredale, 1930
  - † Miolyncina
  - Notadusta Schilder, 1935
  - Notocypraea Schilder, 1927
  - Ovatipsa Iredale, 1931
  - Palmadusta Iredale, 1930
  - Palmulacypraea Meyer, 2003
  - Paradusta Lorenz, 2017
  - † Proadusta Sacco 1894
  - Purpuradusta Schilder, 1939
  - Ransoniella Dolin & Lozouet, 2005
  - Talostolida Iredale, 1931
  - Zoila Jousseaume, 1884

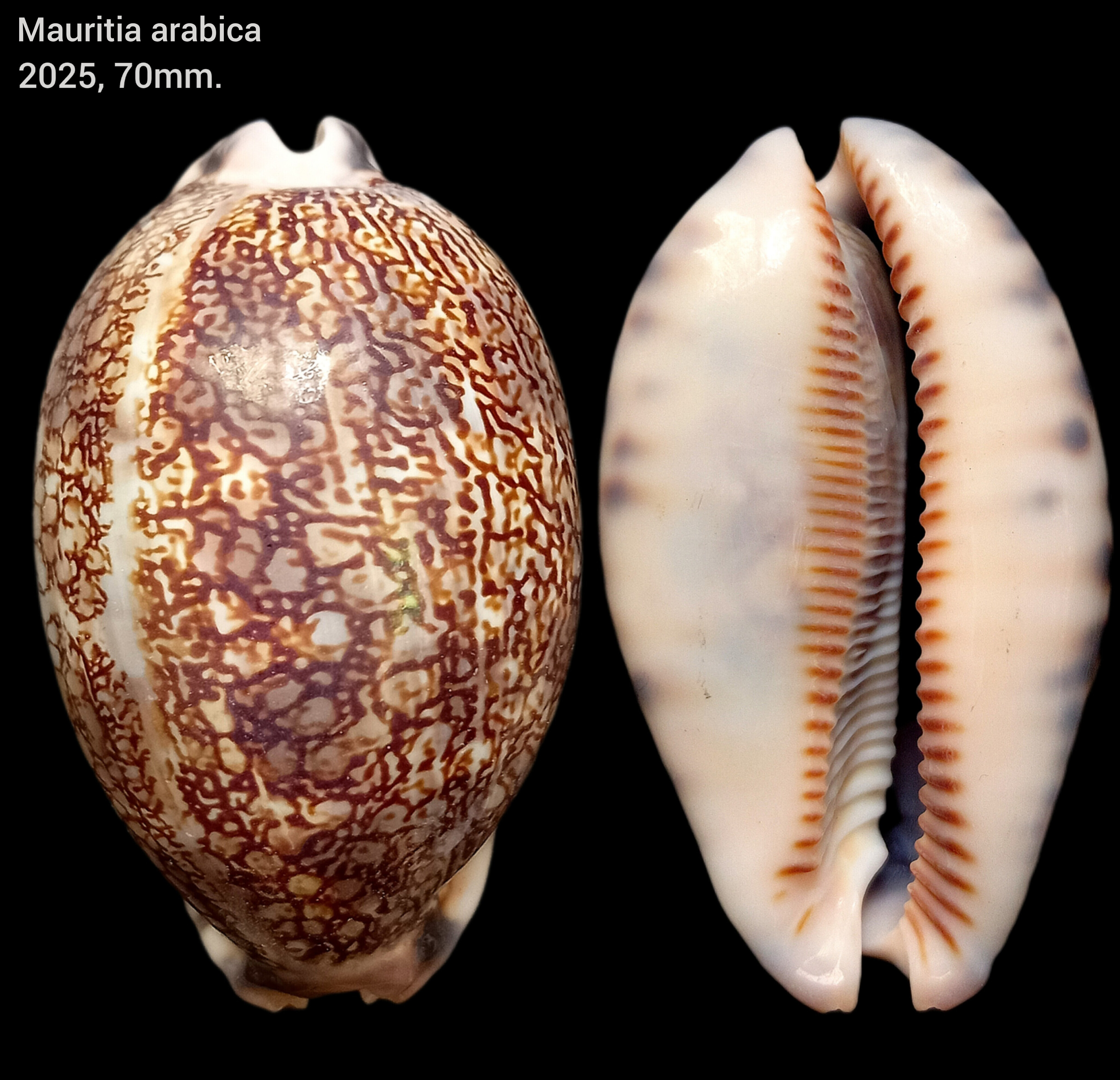
Mauritia arabica

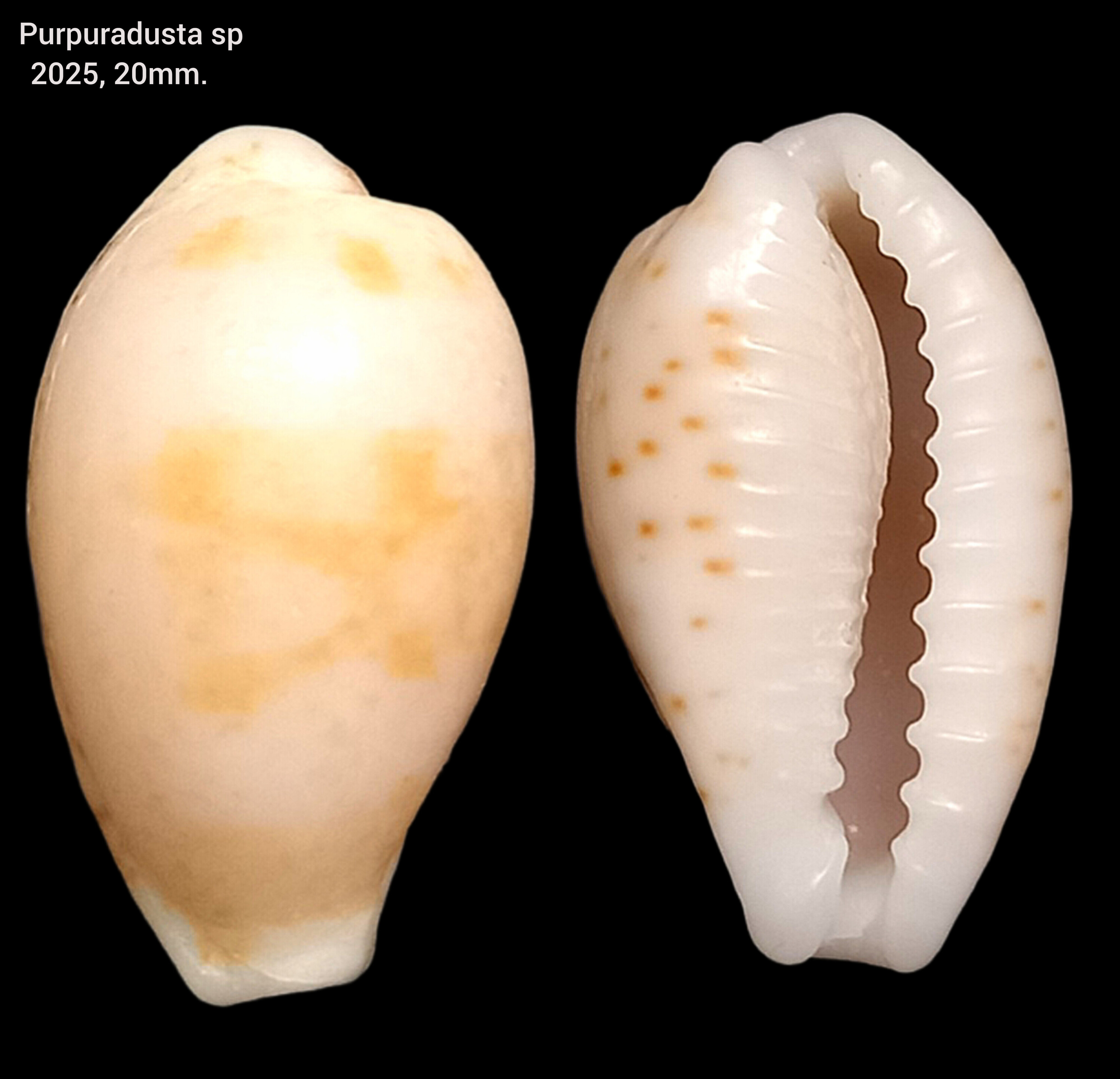
Purpuradusta

== Species ==
For a list of Species in the taxonomic family Cypraeidae, see Cowries.
