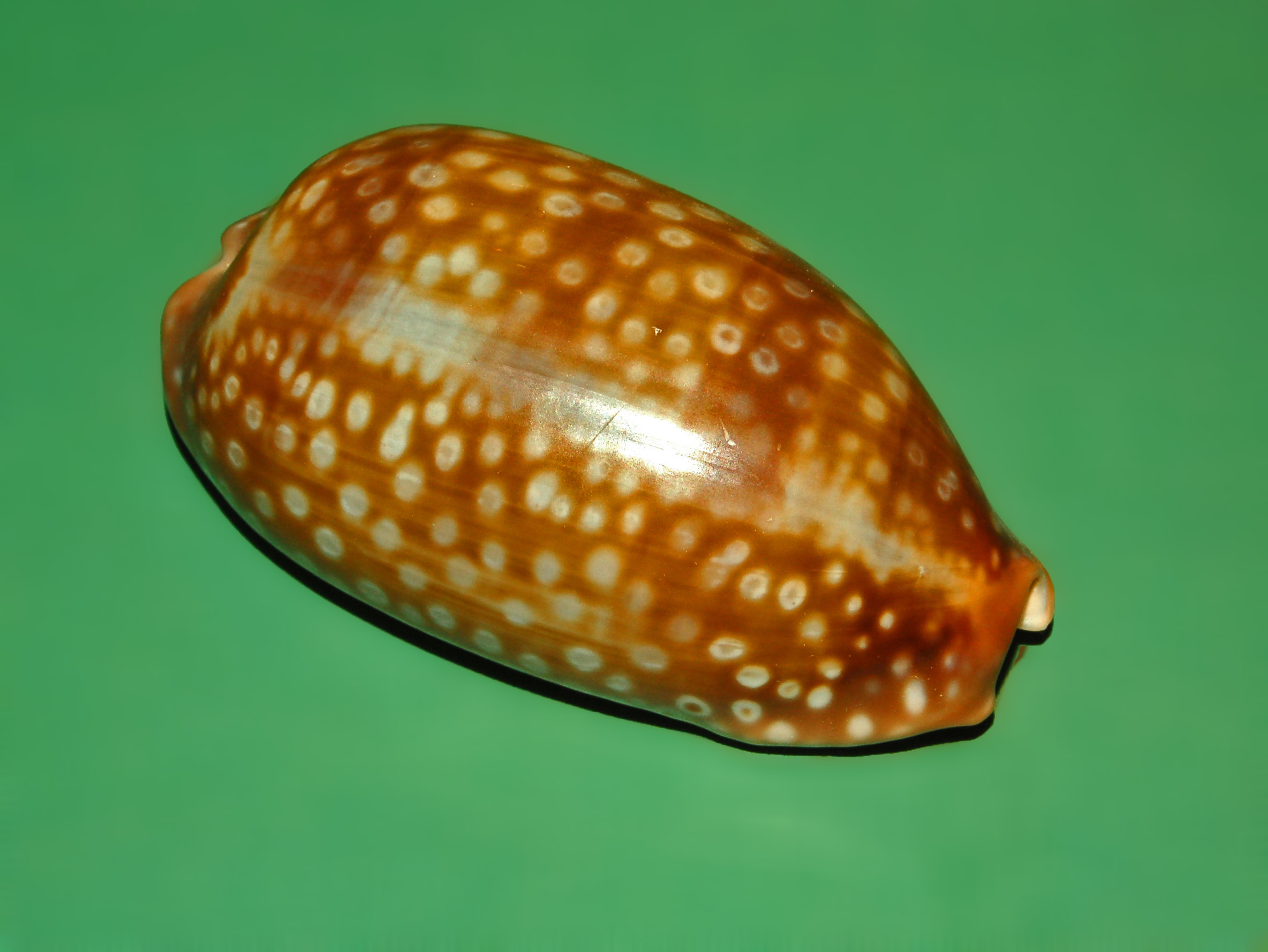
- A shell of Macrocypraea zebra from the Caribbean coast of Panama, anterior end towards the right

Conservation status
- Apparently Secure (NatureServe)

Scientific classification
- Kingdom: Animalia
- Phylum: Mollusca
- Class: Gastropoda
- Subclass: Caenogastropoda
- Order: Littorinimorpha
- Family: Cypraeidae
- Genus: Macrocypraea
- Species: M. zebra

Binomial name
- Macrocypraea zebra (Linnaeus, 1758)

Synonyms
- Cypraea zebra Linnaeus, 1758 (basionym); Cypraea exanthema Linnaeus, 1767; Cypraea dubia Gmelin, J.F., 1791; Cypraea plumbea Gmelin, 1791; Cypraea glauca Röding, 1798; Cypraea leucopsis Shaw, 1803; Erosaria exanthemata Perry, 1811; Erosaria pudica Rous, 1905; Erosaria zebra vallei (f) M. L. Jaume & P. Borro, 1946

= Macrocypraea zebra =

Species of gastropod

Macrocypraea zebra, common name the measled cowrie, is a species of sea snail, a cowry, a marine gastropod mollusk in the family Cypraeidae, the cowries.

== Subspecies ==
- Macrocypraea zebra dissimilis, Schilder, Franz Alfred, 1924

== Description ==
The shells of these quite uncommon cowries reach on average 60–70 millimetres (2.4–2.8 in) of length, with a minimum size of 32 millimetres (1.3 in) and a maximum recorded shell length of 133 millimetres (5.2 in).

The shape is usually long oval, the dorsum surface is smooth and shiny, the basic color is brown, usually with three wide dark brown trasversal bands and several white-bluish spots and a light gray longitudinal mark on the top ('sulcus'). On the sides the white spots become ocellated, showing a small dark brown spots on the center. The base of Macrocypraea zebra shell is pale brown and the long and narrow aperture usually bears long dark brown labial teeth. The interior of the shell may be purple. Macrocypraea zebra is quite similar to Macrocypraea cervus and Macrocypraea cervinetta, but it can be easily distinguished on side view by the presence of mentioned ocellated spots, that are missing in the last two species. In the living cowries of Macrocypraea zebra the mantle is greyish, with short sensorial papillae. The mantle may cover the entire shell and can be withdrawn into the shell opening when the cowry is threatened.

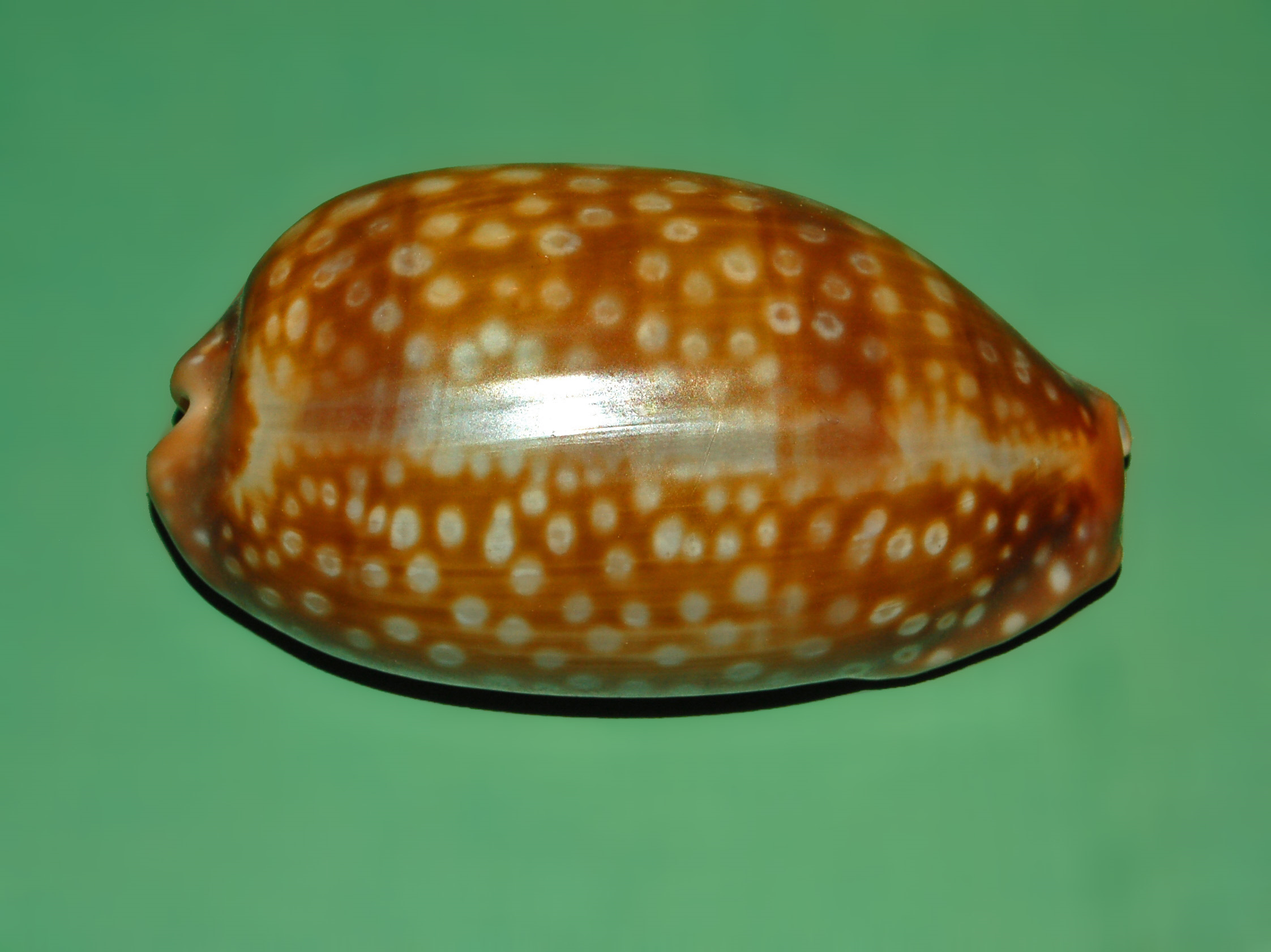
A shell of Macrocypraea zebra from Panama, dorsal view, anterior end towards the right

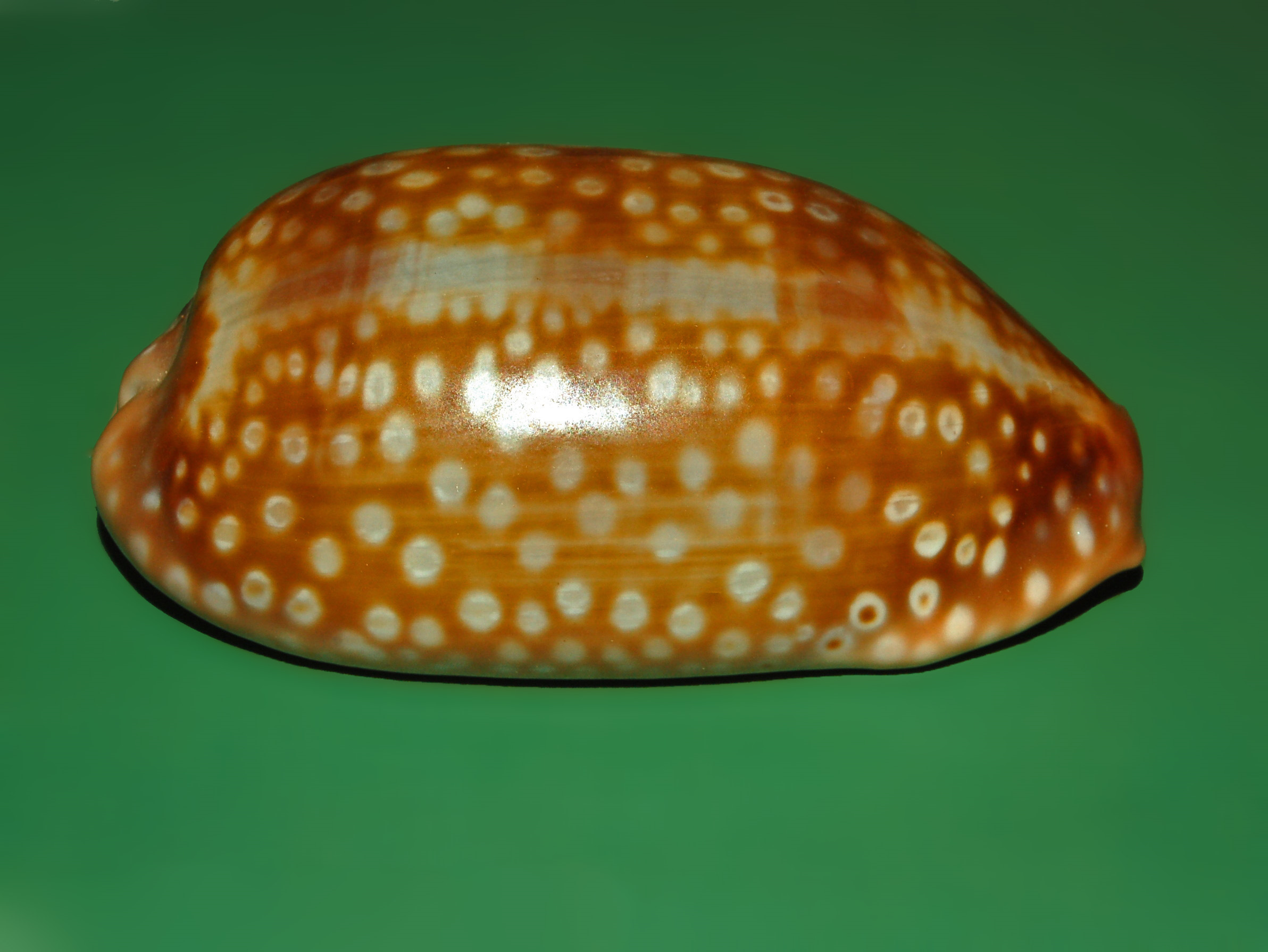
A shell of Macrocypraea zebra from Panama, lateral view, anterior end towards the right

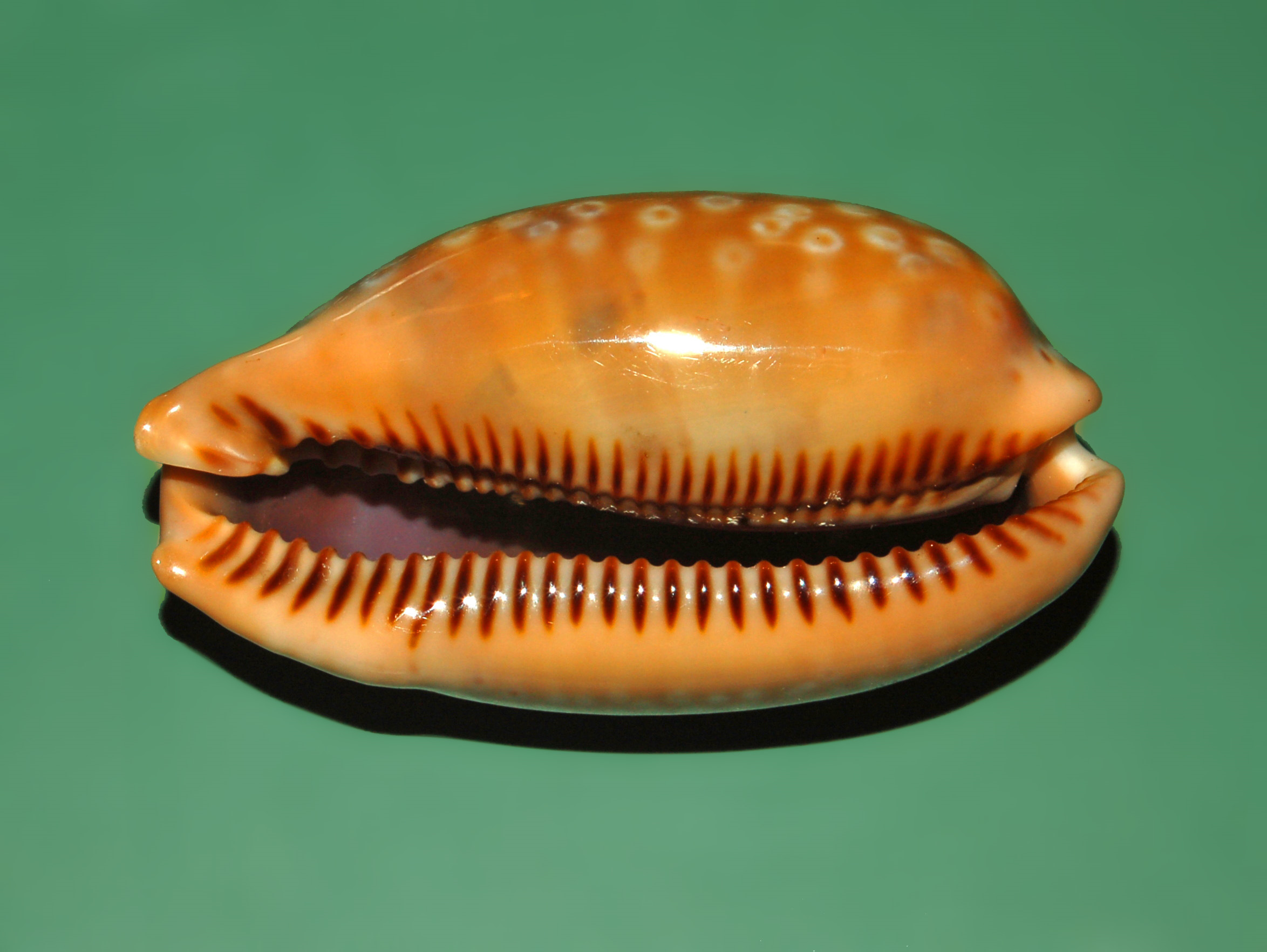
A shell of Macrocypraea zebra from Panama, ventral view, anterior end towards the left

== Distribution ==
This species is distributed in the Atlantic Ocean along North Carolina, Florida and in the Caribbean Sea, the Gulf of Mexico, the West Indies (as far East as Barbados) and Brazil.

== Habitat ==
They live in tropical low intertidal and in subtidal waters, usually on coral reef or under rocks. Minimum recorded depth is 0 m. Maximum recorded depth is 37 m.
