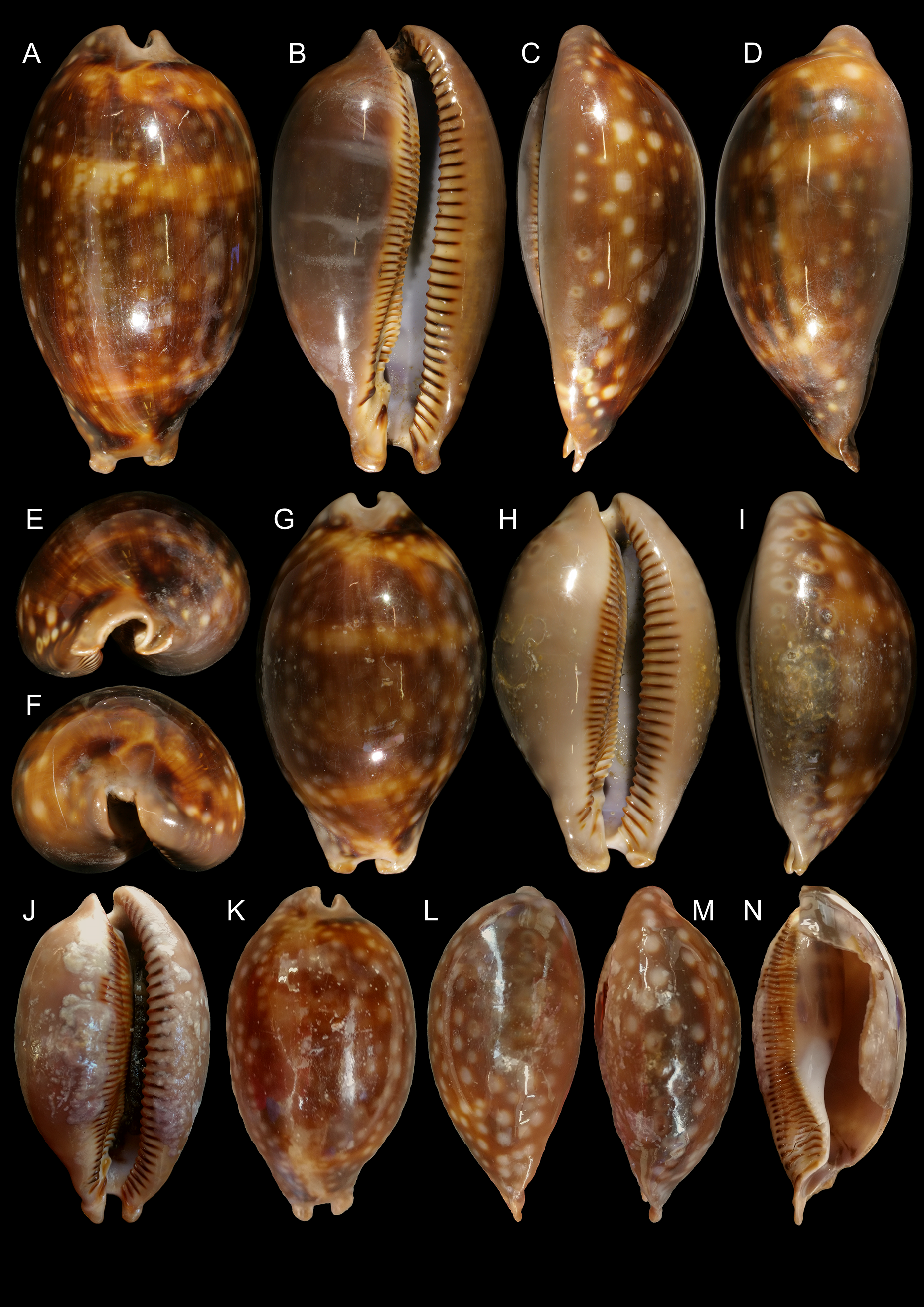
- Macrocypraea mammoth

Scientific classification
- Kingdom: Animalia
- Phylum: Mollusca
- Class: Gastropoda
- Subclass: Caenogastropoda
- Order: Littorinimorpha
- Family: Cypraeidae
- Genus: Macrocypraea
- Species: M. mammoth

Binomial name
- Macrocypraea mammoth Simone & Cavallari, 2020

= Macrocypraea mammoth =

Species of gastropod

Macrocypraea mammoth, common name the mammoth cowrie, is a species of sea snail, a cowry, a marine gastropod mollusk in the family Cypraeidae, the cowries.
