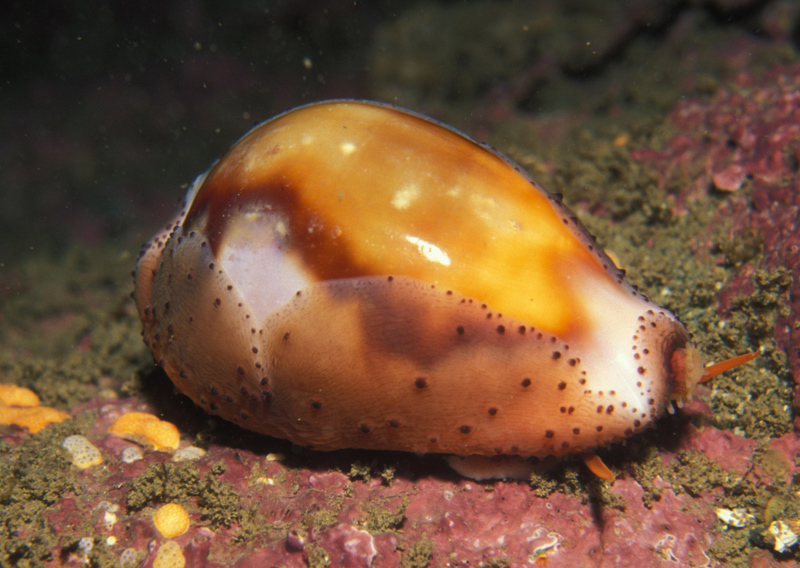
- A live Neobernaya spadicea, in situ, mantle partly extended, head end to the right

Scientific classification
- Kingdom: Animalia
- Phylum: Mollusca
- Class: Gastropoda
- Subclass: Caenogastropoda
- Order: Littorinimorpha
- Superfamily: Cypraeoidea
- Family: Cypraeidae
- Genus: Neobernaya; Schilder, 1927

Type species
- Cypraea spadicea Swainson, 1823

= Neobernaya =

Genus of gastropods

Neobernaya is a genus of tropical sea snail, cowries, marine gastropod mollusks in the subfamily Zonariinae of the family Cypraeidae, the cowries.

This was previously a subgenus of Cypraea.

== Species ==
Species within the genus Neobernaya include:

- Neobernaya spadicea (Swainson, 1823)
