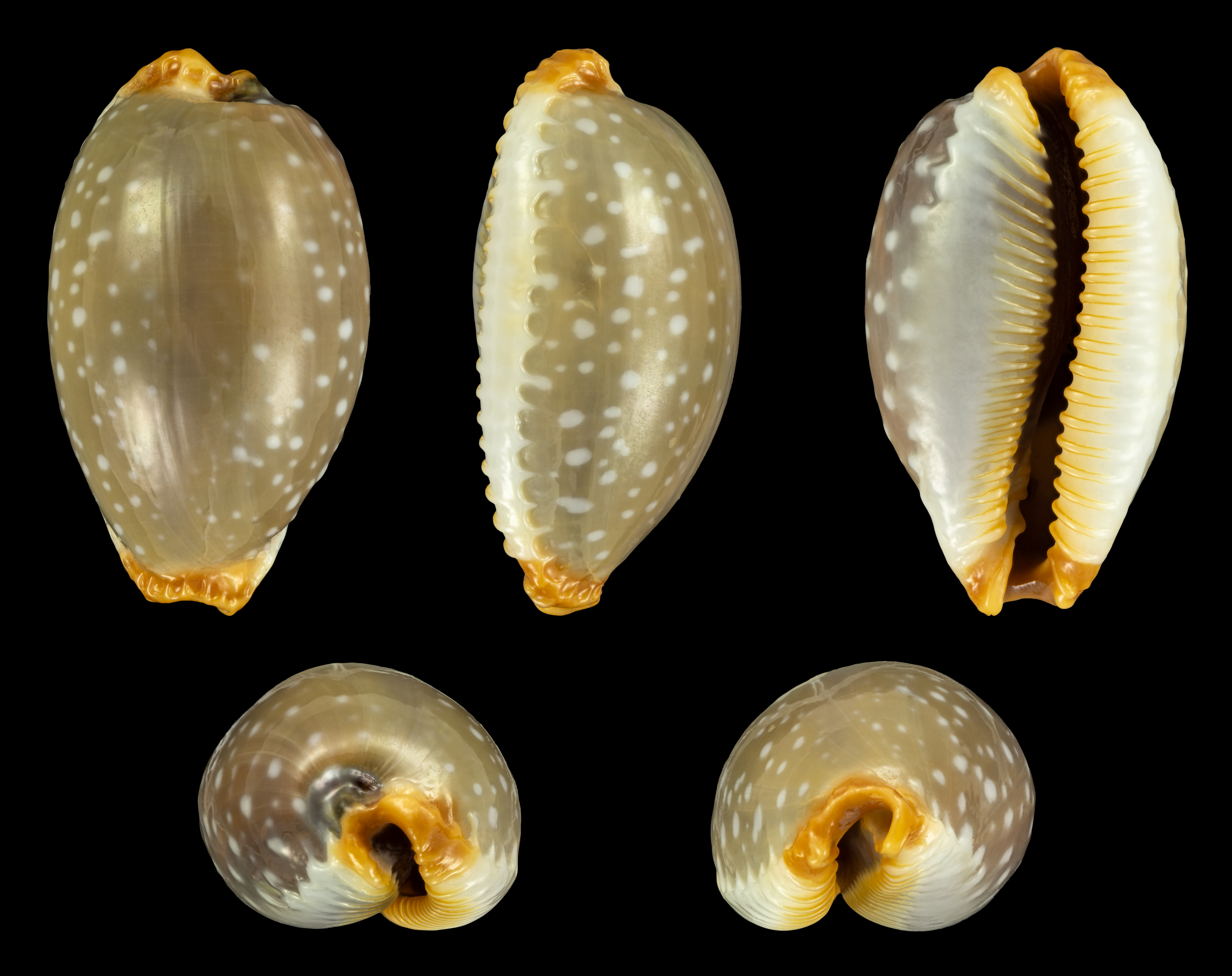
- Shell of Staphylaea limacina from the Philippines

Scientific classification
- Kingdom: Animalia
- Phylum: Mollusca
- Class: Gastropoda
- Subclass: Caenogastropoda
- Order: Littorinimorpha
- Family: Cypraeidae
- Genus: Staphylaea
- Species: S. limacina

Binomial name
- Staphylaea limacina (Lamarck, 1810)

Synonyms
- Cypraea limacina Lamarck, 1810 (basionym)

= Staphylaea limacina =

Species of gastropod

Staphylaea limacina, common name slug-like cowry, is a species of sea snail, a cowry, a marine gastropod mollusk in the family Cypraeidae, the cowries.

== Description ==
The shell size varies between 8 mm and 39 mm. This shell is oval, the dorsum surface is usually pale brown or pinkish with whitish spots or small round whitish protuberances and two orange-brown areas at the extremities, while the base is white. In the living cowries the mantle may have a brown, orange or reddish coloration, with paler finger-like projections.

== Distribution ==
This species is distributed in the Southeast Asia, in Australia and in the Indian Ocean along Aldabra, Chagos, the Comores, Kenya, Madagascar, the Mascarene Basin, Mauritius, Mozambique, Réunion, the Seychelles and Tanzania.

== Subspecies ==
- Staphylaea limacina clarissa Lorenz, 1989
- Staphylaea limacina interstincta (Wood, 1828)
