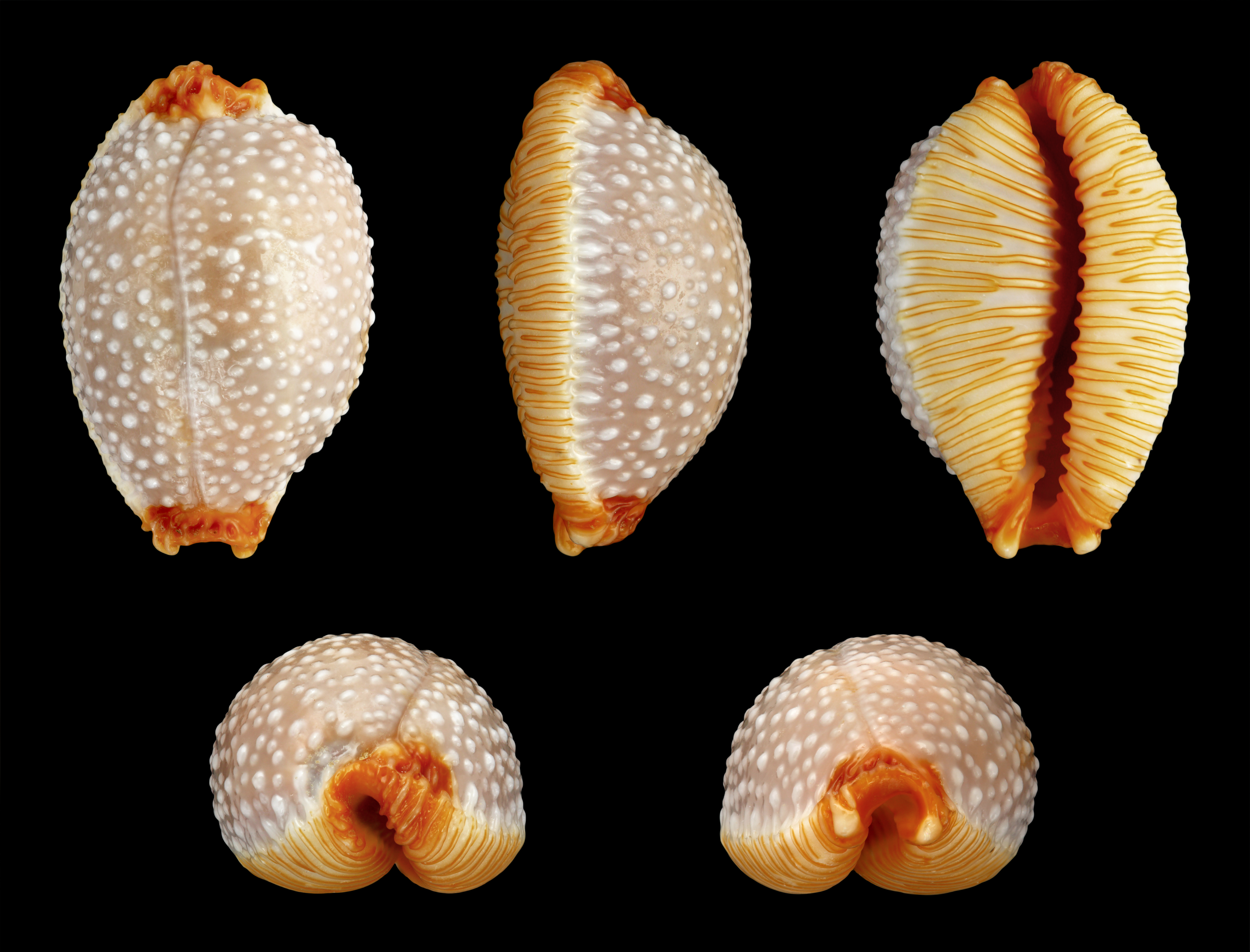
- Staphylaea staphylaea shell

Scientific classification
- Kingdom: Animalia
- Phylum: Mollusca
- Class: Gastropoda
- Subclass: Caenogastropoda
- Order: Littorinimorpha
- Family: Cypraeidae
- Genus: Staphylaea; Jousseaume, 1884

= Staphylaea =

Genus of gastropods

Staphylaea is a genus of sea snails, marine gastropod mollusks in the family Cypraeidae, the cowries.

== Species ==
Species within the genus Staphylaea include:

- Staphylaea limacina (Lamarck, 1810)
- Staphylaea semiplota (Mighels, 1845)
- Staphylaea staphylaea (Linnaeus, 1758)

Synonyms

- Staphylaea nucleus (Linnaeus, 1758) is a synonym of Nucleolaria nucleus (Linnaeus, 1758)
