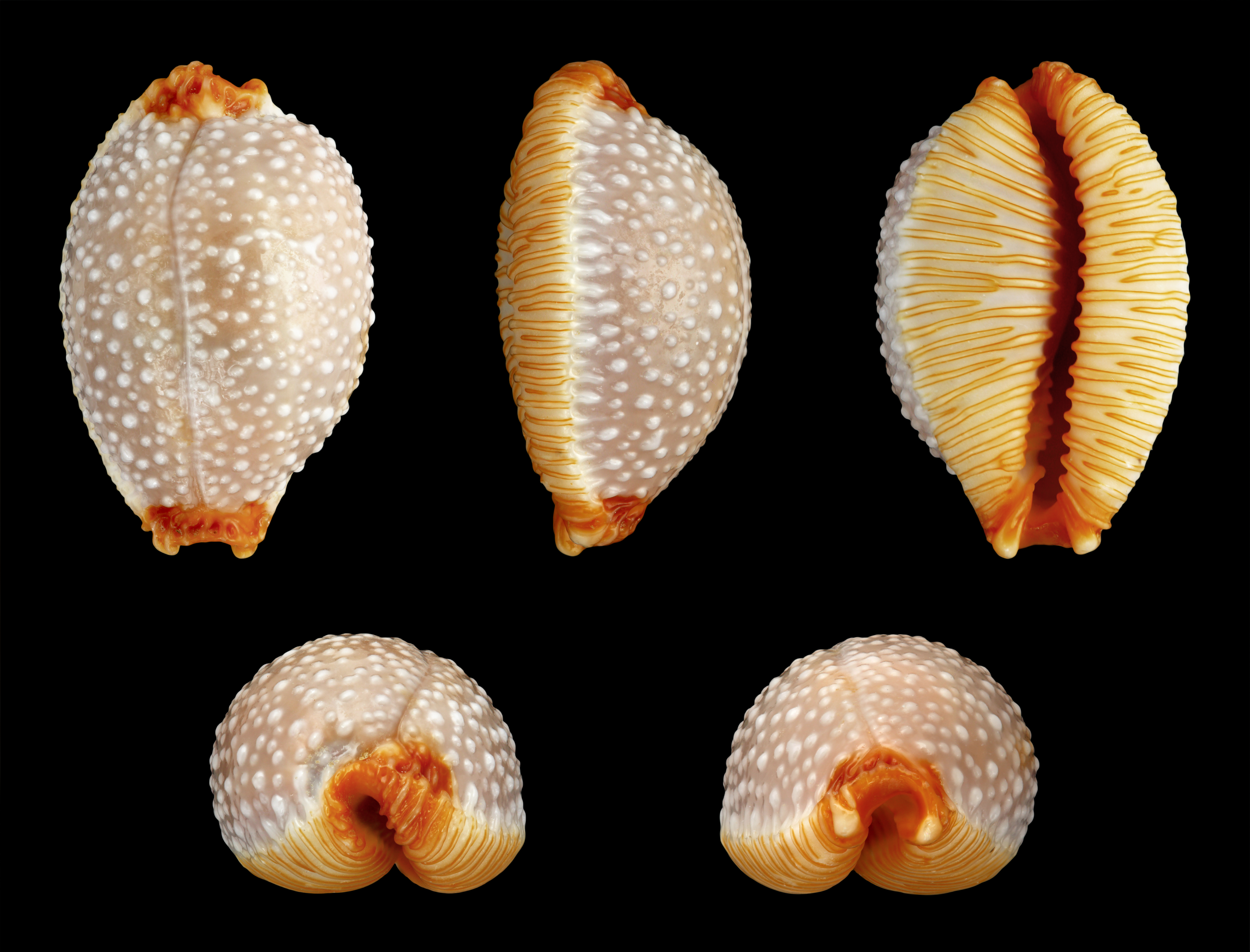
- Staphylaea staphylaea shell

Scientific classification
- Kingdom: Animalia
- Phylum: Mollusca
- Class: Gastropoda
- Subclass: Caenogastropoda
- Order: Littorinimorpha
- Family: Cypraeidae
- Genus: Staphylaea
- Species: S. staphylaea

Binomial name
- Staphylaea staphylaea (Linnaeus, 1758)

Synonyms
- Cypraea staphylaea Linnaeus, 1758 (basionym); Cypraea atrata Gray, J.E., 1825; Cypraea deprava Dautzenberg, Ph., 1903; Pustularia depravata Dautzenberg, Ph., 1903; Cypraea albicilla Sulliotti, G.R., 1924; Cypraea expallescens Dautzenberg, Ph. & J.L. Bouge, 1933; Staphylaea fortis Coen, G.S., 1949; Staphylaea grisea Coen, G.S., 1949; Staphylaea lactea Coen, G.S., 1949; Staphylaea nitida Coen, G.S., 1949

= Staphylaea staphylaea =

Species of gastropod

Staphylaea staphylaea (common name: the stippled cowry) is a species of sea snail, a cowry, a marine gastropod mollusk in the family Cypraeidae, the cowries.

There is one subspecies : Staphylaea staphylaea laevigata Dautz., 1932.

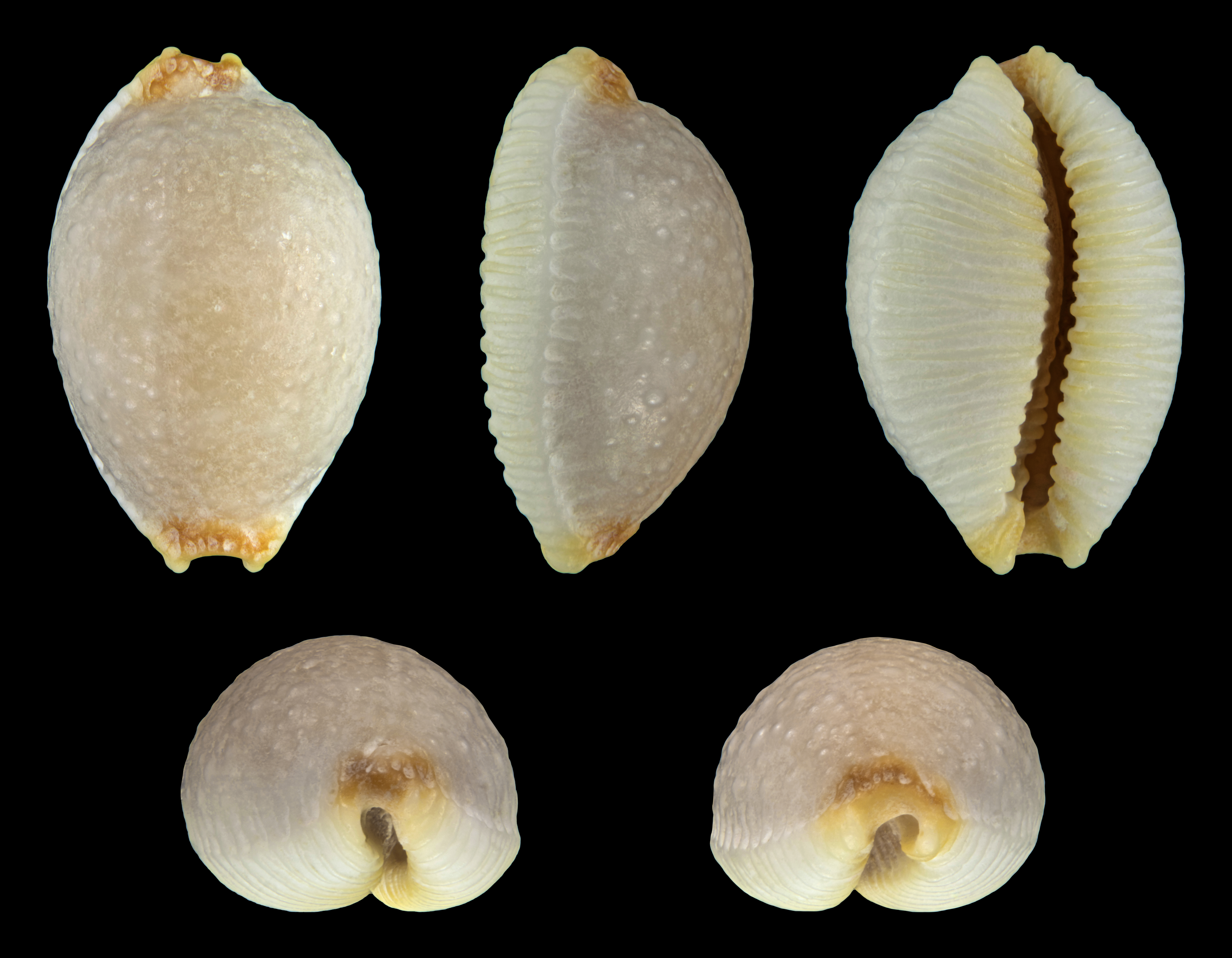
Staphylaea staphylaea laevigata

== Description ==
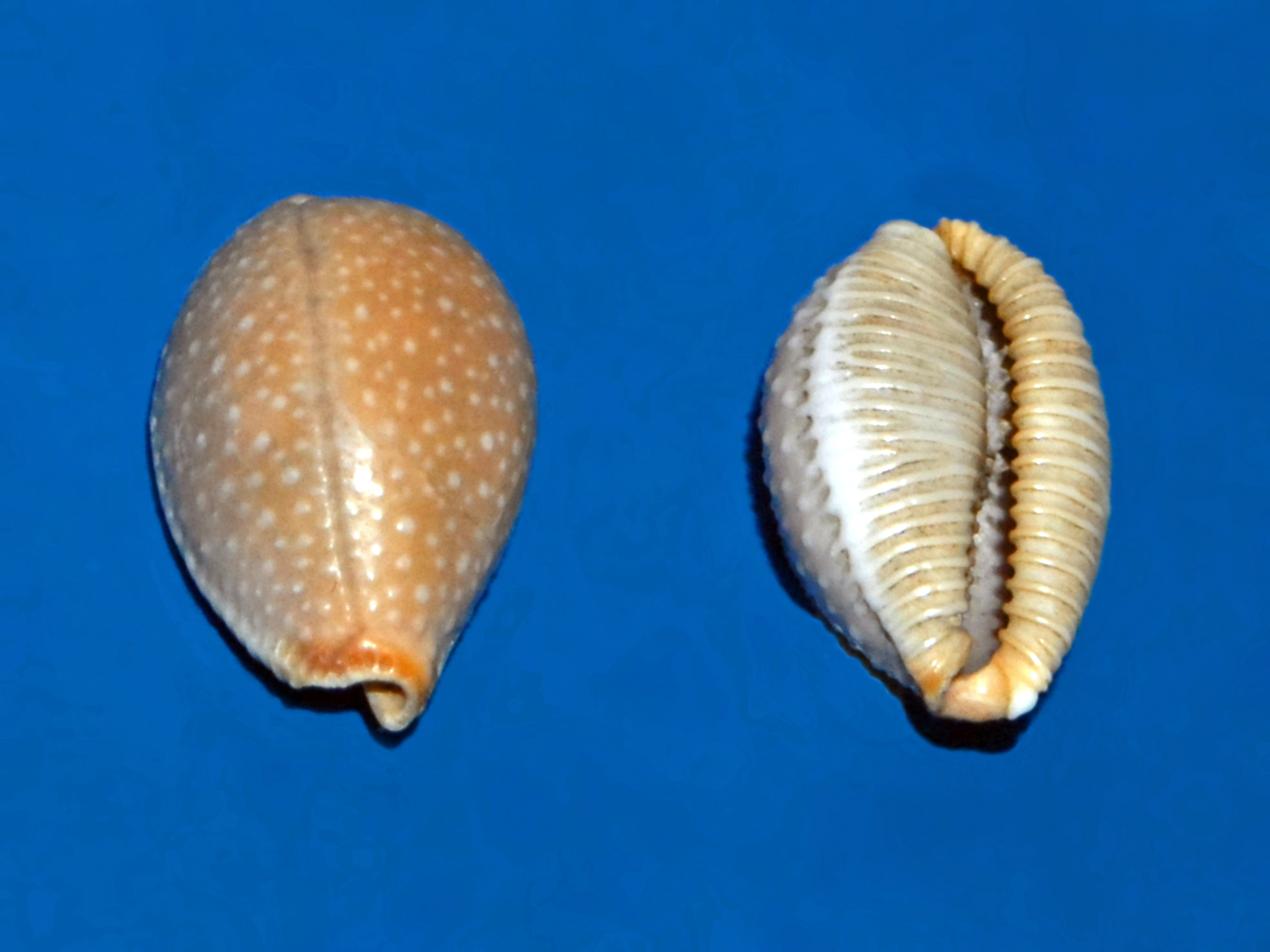
Shells of Staphylaea staphylaea from Reunion Island at the Museo Civico di Storia Naturale di Milano. Dorsal and ventral view

The shell of Staphylaea staphylaea reaches a size of 7 – 29 mm. It is oval, the dorsum surface is pale greyish with a thin longitudinal line in the middle, many small round protuberances and two brown areas at the extremities. The base is pale brown. The small teeth are extended to both sides of the entire base. In the living cowries the transparent mantle has an orange coloration, with long finger-like projections.

== Distribution ==
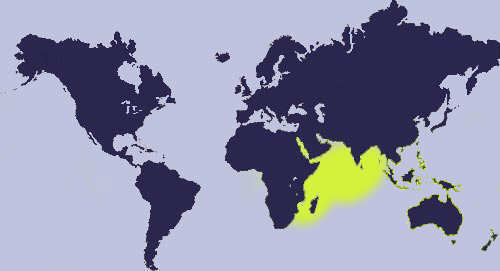
Distribution map of Staphylaea staphylaea

This species is distributed in the Red Sea and in the Indian Ocean along Aldabra, Chagos, the Comores, the East Coast of South Africa, Kenya, Madagascar, the Mascarene Basin, Mauritius, Mozambique, Réunion, the Seychelles, Somalia, South Mozambique, Tanzania and in Polynesia, Australia and Vanuatu.
