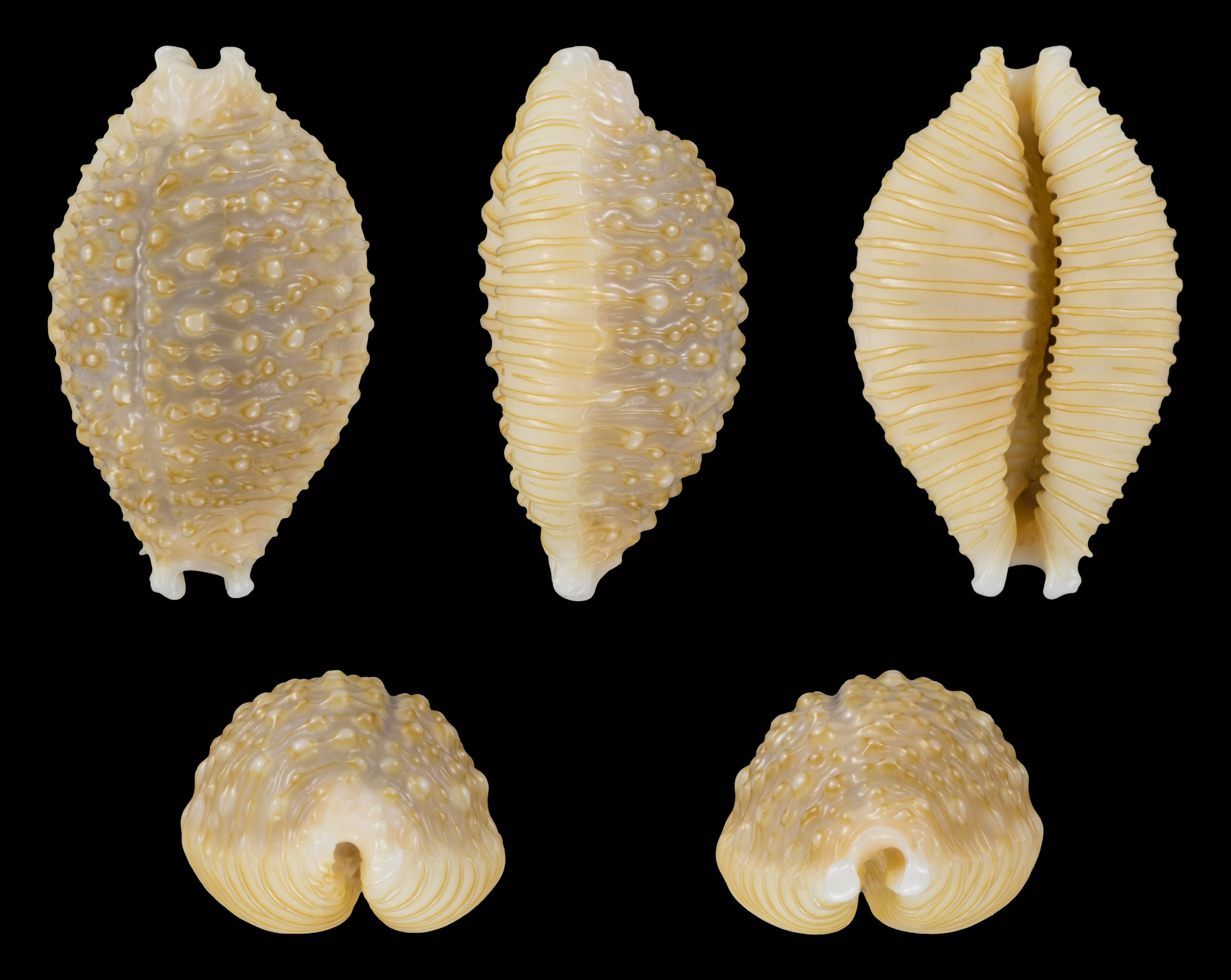
- Nucleolaria nucleus

Scientific classification
- Kingdom: Animalia
- Phylum: Mollusca
- Class: Gastropoda
- Subclass: Caenogastropoda
- Order: Littorinimorpha
- Family: Cypraeidae
- Genus: Nucleolaria
- Species: N. nucleus

Binomial name
- Nucleolaria nucleus (Linnaeus, 1758)

Synonyms
- Cypraea nucleus Linnaeus, 1758 (basionym)

= Nucleolaria nucleus =

Species of gastropod

Nucleolaria nucleus, the wrinkled cowry, is a species of sea snail, a cowry, a marine gastropod mollusk in the family Cypraeidae, the cowries.

There is one subspecies: Staphylaea nucleus madagascariensis (Gmelin, 1791) (synonym : Cypraea madagascariensis Gmelin, 1791) (common name: the wrinkled cowrie). This subspecies is distributed in the Indian Ocean along Kenya, Madagascar and Tanzania.

== Description ==
These quite rare shells reach on average 16–20 millimetres (0.63–0.79 in) length, with a maximum size of 30 millimetres (1.2 in) and a minimum size of 10 millimetres (0.39 in). This shell is oval, the dorsum surface is light orange-brown with a thin longitudinal line in the middle, many small round protuberances and two orange areas at the extremities. The base is light orange and the small teeth are extended to both sides of the entire base. In the living cowries the mantle is brownish, with well-developed papillae.

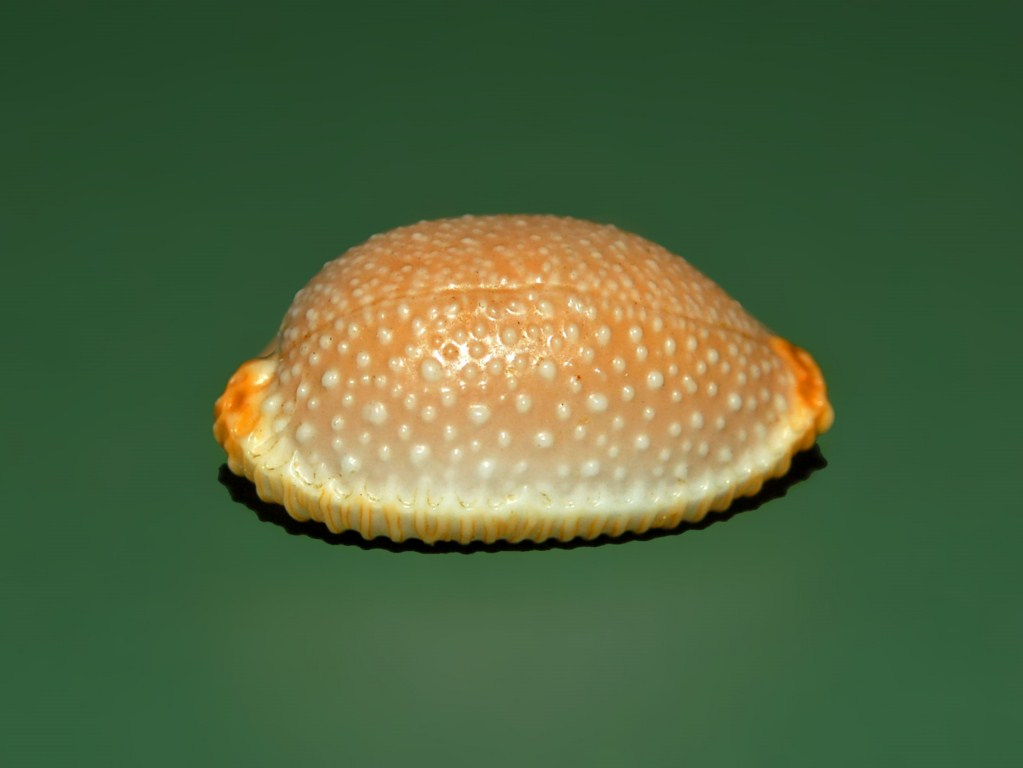
Staphylaea nucleus, side view, anterior end towards the right

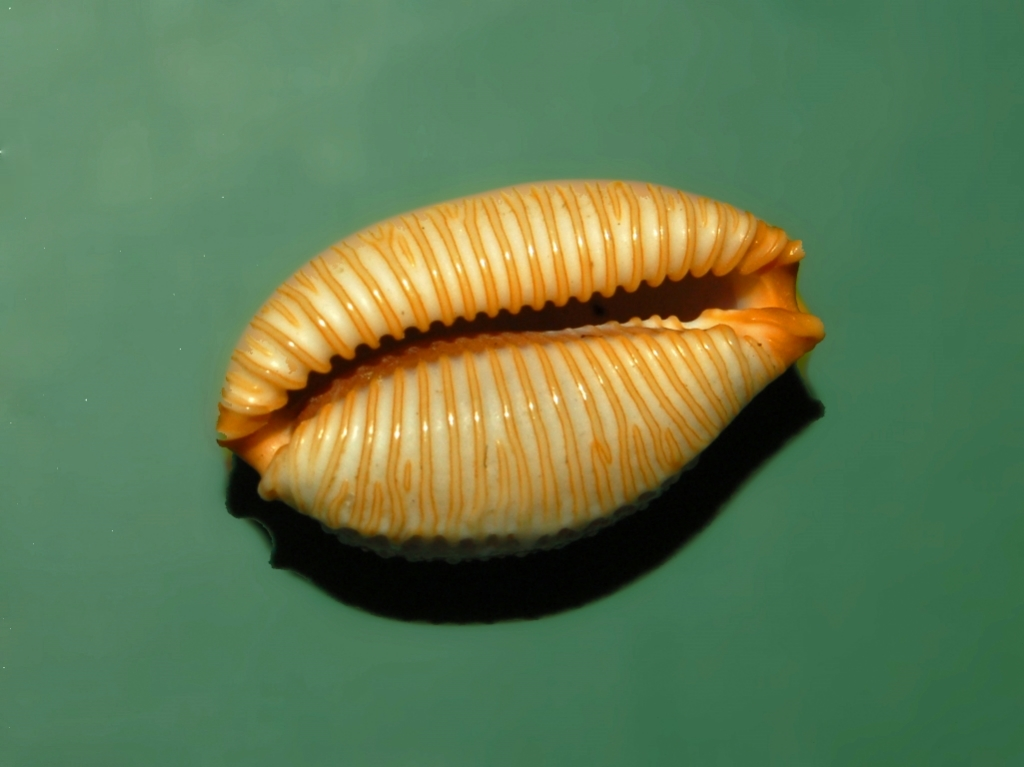
Staphylaea nucleus, apertural view of a shell

== Distribution ==
This species is distributed in the Red Sea and in the Indian Ocean along Aldabra, Chagos, Kenya, Madagascar, the Mascarene Basin, Mauritius, Réunion, the Seychelles, Somalia and Tanzania, as well in Western Central Pacific Ocean (Philippines, Indonesia, Australia, Guam, Hawaii and Vanuatu).
