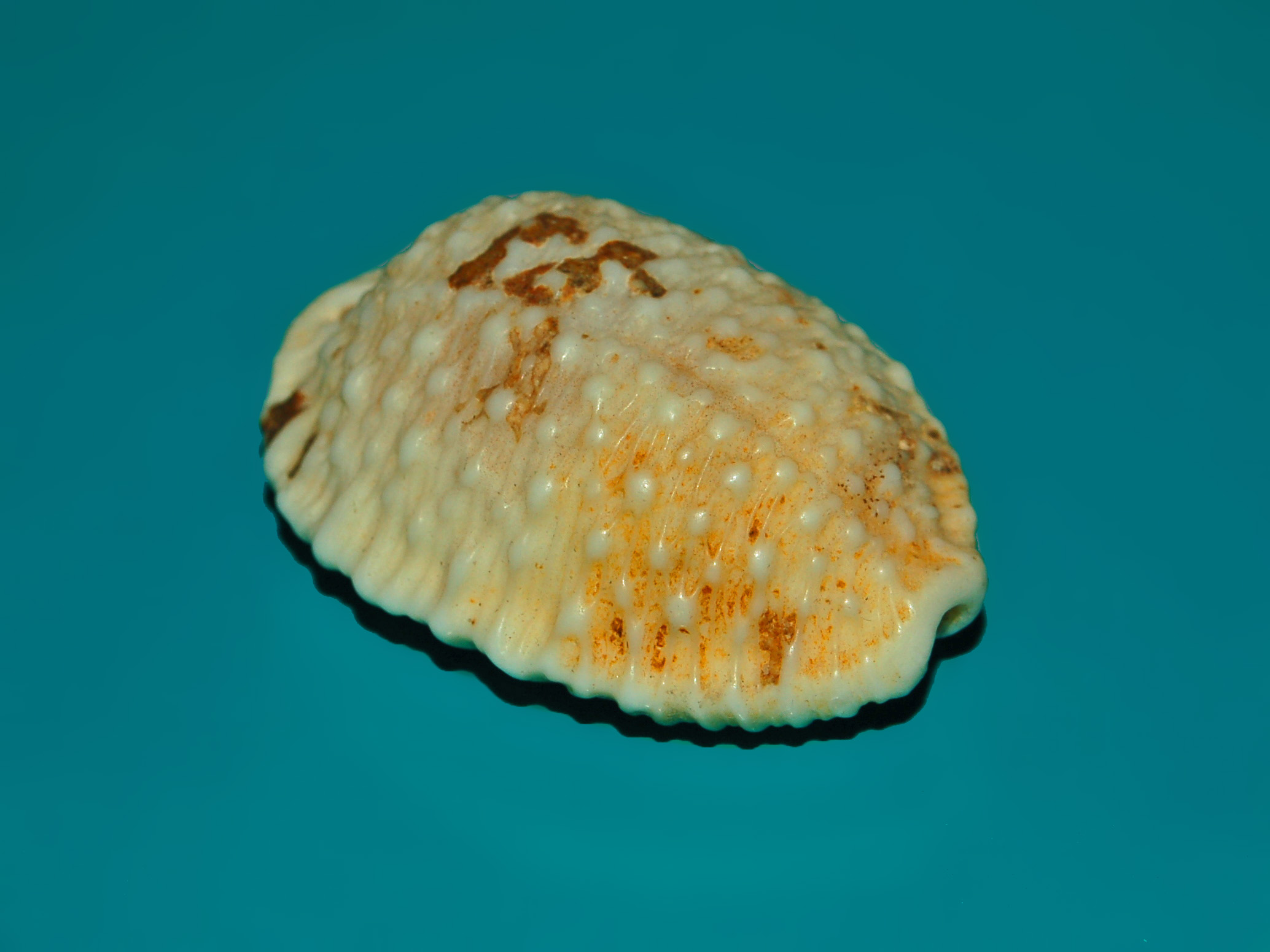
- A shell of Nucleolaria granulata, anterior end towards the right

Scientific classification
- Kingdom: Animalia
- Phylum: Mollusca
- Class: Gastropoda
- Subclass: Caenogastropoda
- Order: Littorinimorpha
- Family: Cypraeidae
- Genus: Nucleolaria
- Species: N. granulata

Binomial name
- Nucleolaria granulata W.H. Pease, 1862

Synonyms
- Nucleolaria granulata cassiaui Burgess 1965; Nucleolaria granulata granulata Pease 1862; Cypraea madagascariensis Sowerby, G.B. I, 1832; Cypraea honoluluensis Melvill, J.C., 1888

= Nucleolaria granulata =

Species of gastropod

Nucleolaria granulata, common name the granulated cowry, is a species of sea snail, a cowry, a marine gastropod mollusk in the family Cypraeidae, the cowries.

== Description ==
The shell of this quite uncommon cowry reaches on average 22–28 millimetres (0.87–1.10 in) in length, with a maximum size of 49 millimetres (1.9 in) and a minimum size of 15 millimetres (0.59 in). The shape of the shells is a wide oval, and it appears flattened. The dorsum surface is rough, with a deep longitudinal line in the middle and many protuberances of various sizes, each connected by thin ribs. The aperture is narrow, and the outer and inner lips have fine teeth. The base is wide, and the teeth are extended to cross the entire base as ribs on both sides. In the living cowries, the mantle is pinkish or reddish, with well-developed papillae, which serve to camouflage these mollusks against the seabed.

Young shells often exhibit gloss, but become fully dull upon reaching maturity.

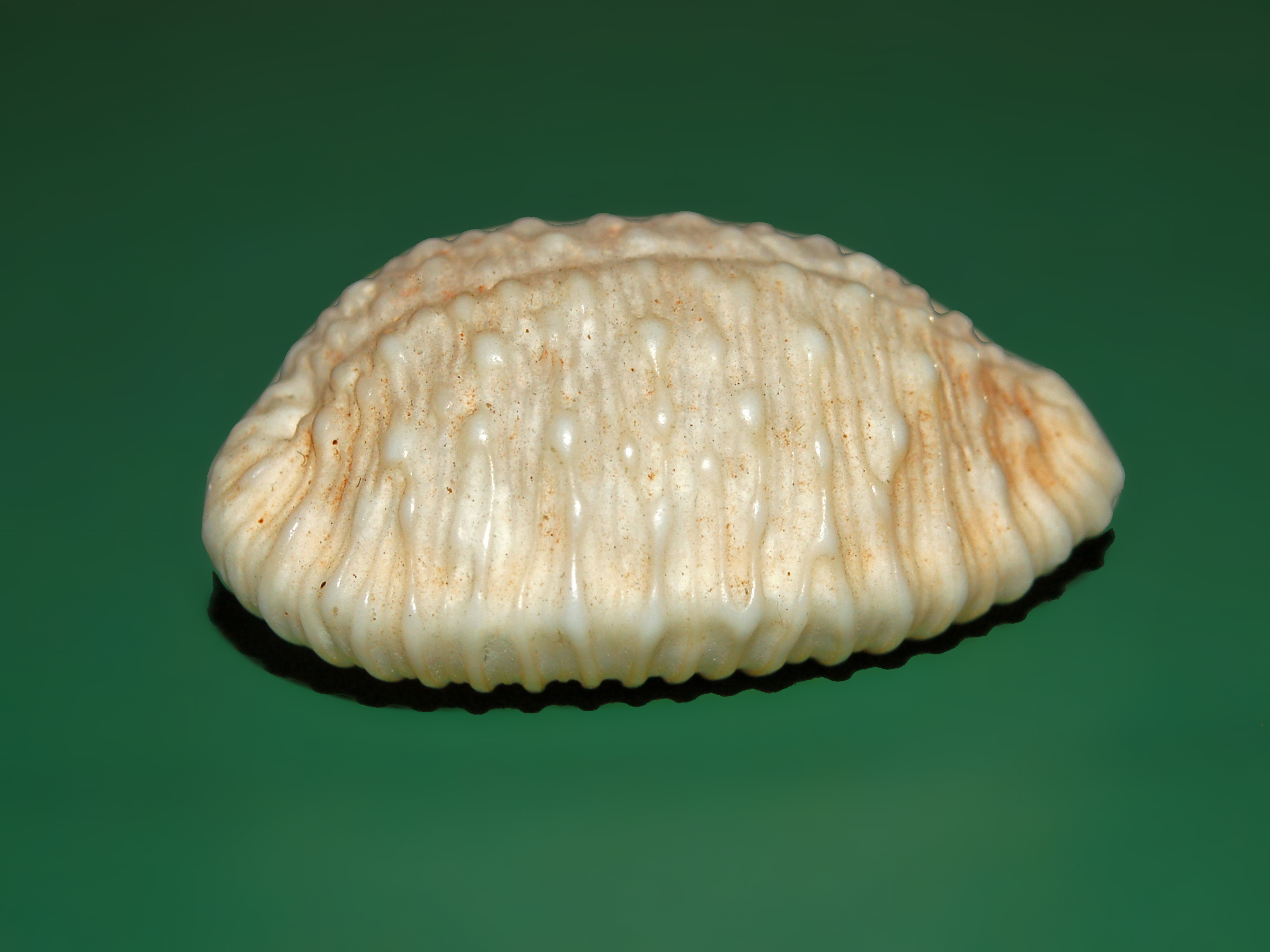
Nucleolaria granulata, side view, anterior end towards the right

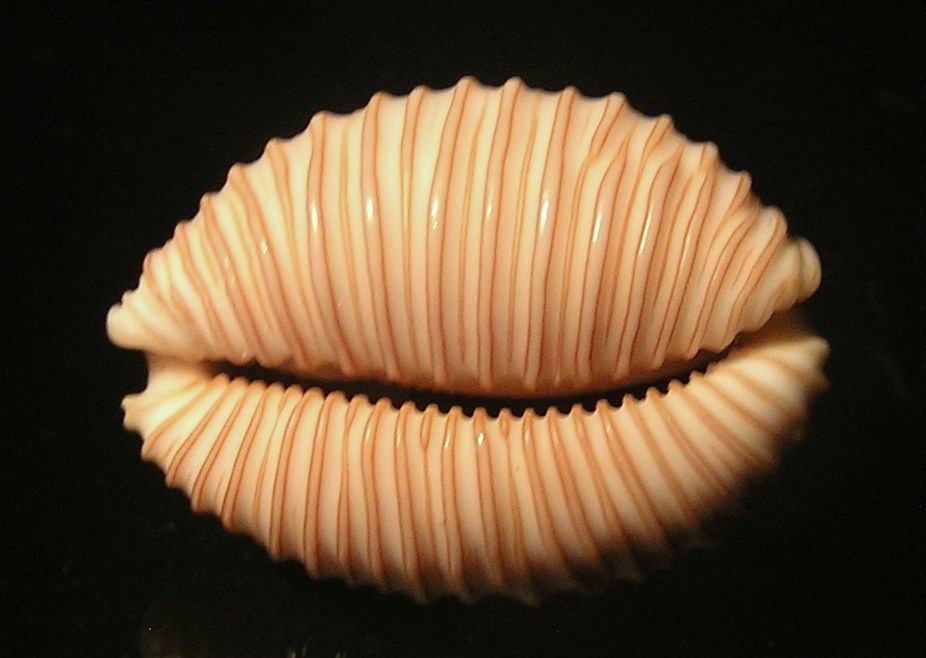
Nucleolaria granulata, apertural view of the shell

== Distribution ==
This species is endemic to the Hawaii and Marquesas Islands.

== Habitat ==
Nucleolaria granulata lives in tropical shallow waters under rocks and caves, usually at 5–25 metres (16–82 ft) of depth, feeding at night on sponges, algae or coral polyps.
