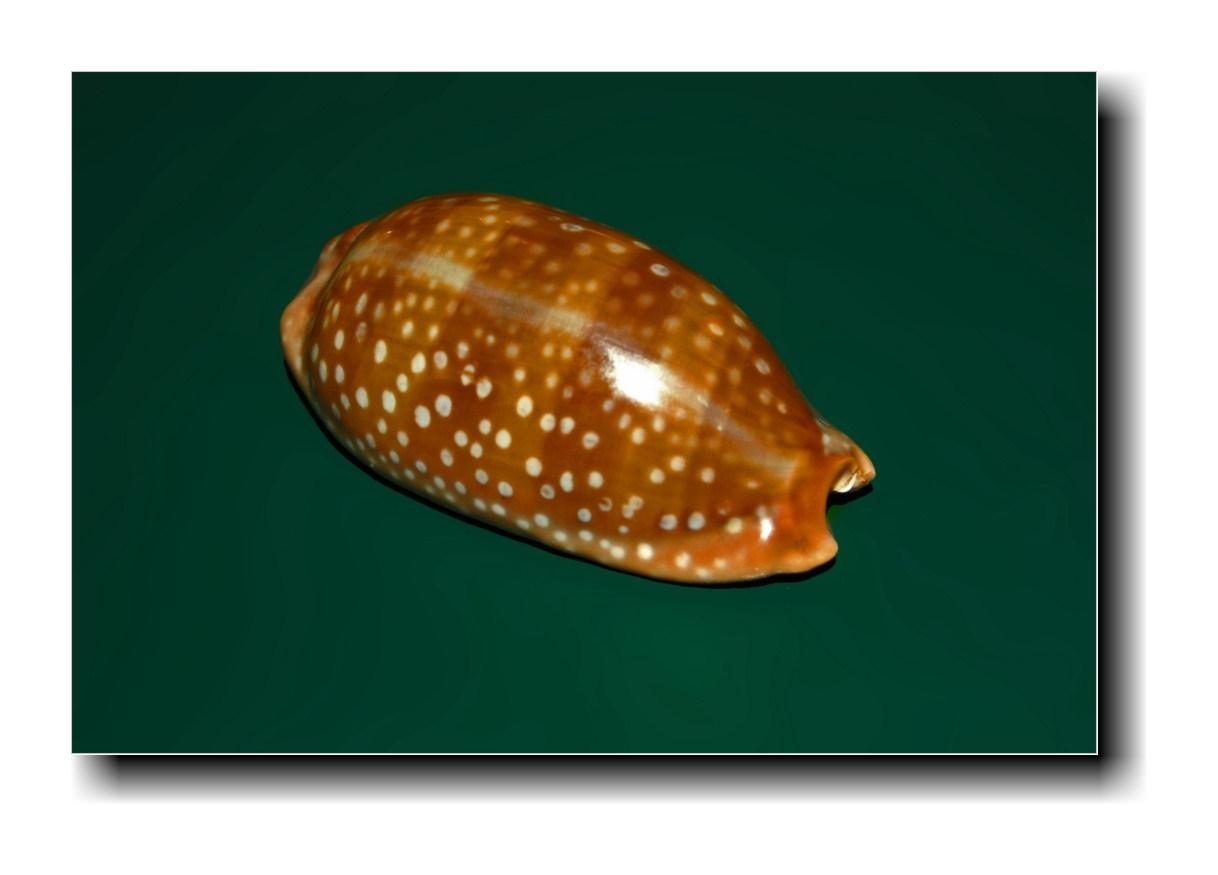
- A shell of Macrocypraea cervinetta from Panama, dorsal view, anterior end towards the right

Scientific classification
- Kingdom: Animalia
- Phylum: Mollusca
- Class: Gastropoda
- Subclass: Caenogastropoda
- Order: Littorinimorpha
- Family: Cypraeidae
- Genus: Macrocypraea; Schilder, 1930

Type species
- Cypraea exanthema Linnaeus, 1767

Synonyms
- Macrocypraea (Lorenzicypraea) Petuch & Drolshagen, 2011· accepted, alternate representation

= Macrocypraea =

Genus of gastropods

Macrocypraea is a genus of large sea snails, cowries, marine gastropod mollusks in the family Cypraeidae, the cowries.

== Species ==
Species within the genus Macrocypraea include:

- Macrocypraea cervinetta (Kiener, 1843)
- Macrocypraea cervus (Linnaeus, 1771)
- Macrocypraea mammoth Simone & Cavallari, 2020
- Macrocypraea zebra (Linnaeus, 1758)
