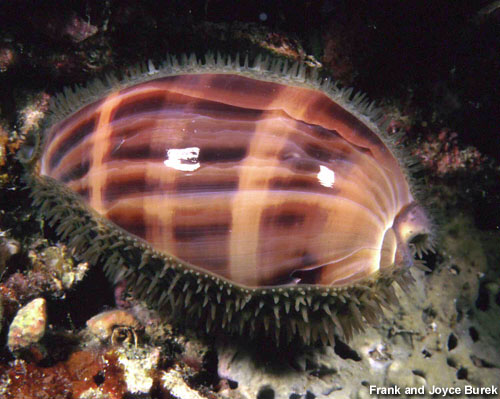
- A living, sub-adult Macrocypraea cervus

Conservation status
- Vulnerable (NatureServe)

Scientific classification
- Kingdom: Animalia
- Phylum: Mollusca
- Class: Gastropoda
- Subclass: Caenogastropoda
- Order: Littorinimorpha
- Family: Cypraeidae
- Genus: Macrocypraea
- Species: M. cervus

Binomial name
- Macrocypraea cervus (Linnaeus, 1771)

Synonyms
- Cypraea cervus (Linnaeus, 1771); Cypraea bifasciata Gmelin, 1791; Cypraea oculata Gmelin, 1791; Cypraea meleagris Röding, 1798; Cypraea cervina Lamarck, 1822; Cypraea jousseaumei Vayssière, 1905; Macrocypraea peilei Schilder, 1932

= Macrocypraea cervus =

Species of gastropod

Macrocypraea cervus, common name the Atlantic deer cowry, is a species of large sea snail, a very large cowry, a marine gastropod mollusk in the family Cypraeidae, the cowries.

== Distribution ==
This species is mainly distributed in the tropical Atlantic Ocean including the Caribbean Sea, and in the waters off South Carolina, Florida, Mexico, Brazil, Cuba and the Bermudas.

== Description ==
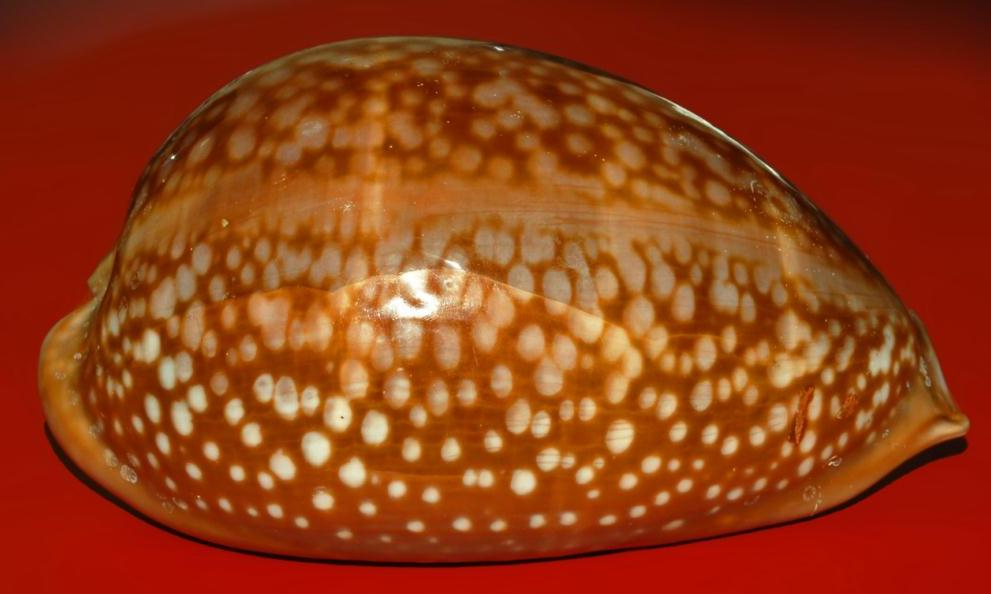
Giant Macrocypraea cervus – Florida

This species is one of the largest cowries. It is quite similar in shape and colour to Macrocypraea cervinetta, but it is much larger. The maximum recorded shell length is 190 millimetres (7.5 in), while minimum length is about 40 millimetres (1.6 in).

The shell is elongated, its basic color is light brown, with small whitish ocellated spots on the dorsum, like a young fawn (hence the Latin name cervus, meaning 'deer'). Juveniles have no spots. The dorsum also shows a few transverse clearer bands, and a longitudinal line where the two edges of the mantle meet. The apertural teeth are dark brown. The mantle of the living cowry is dark grayish and completely covered in short fringes.

== Habitat ==
Living cowries can mainly be encountered under corals and rocks in shallow waters at a maximum depth of 35 m. They feed on algae.
