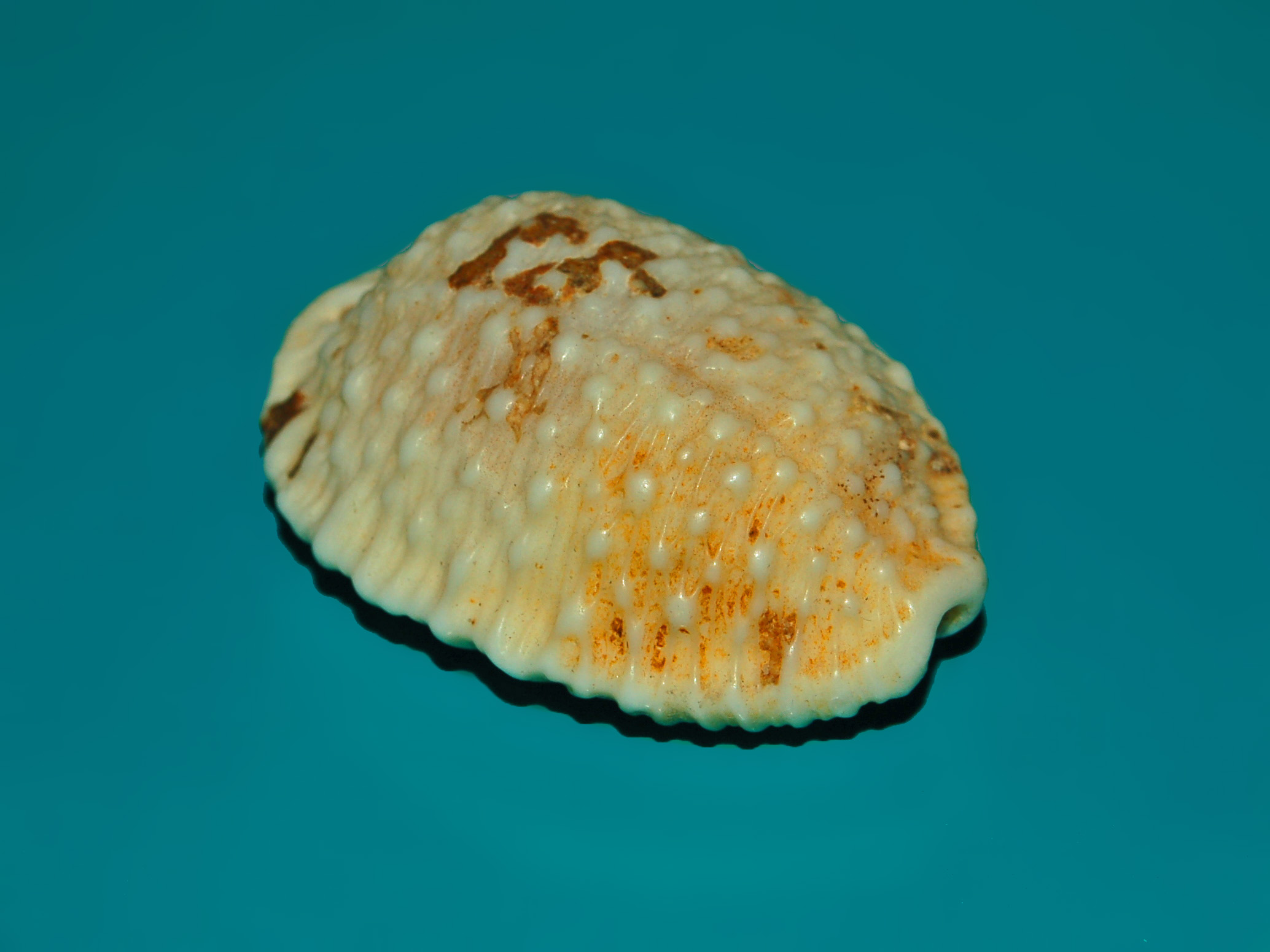
- Nucleolaria granulata

Scientific classification
- Domain: Eukaryota
- Kingdom: Animalia
- Phylum: Mollusca
- Class: Gastropoda
- Subclass: Caenogastropoda
- Order: Littorinimorpha
- Family: Cypraeidae
- Genus: Nucleolaria; Oyama, 1959

= Nucleolaria =

Genus of sea snails

Nucleolaria is a genus of gastropods belonging to the family Cypraeidae.

The species of this genus are found in Southern Hemisphere.

Species:

- Nucleolaria cassiaui (Burgess, 1965)
- Nucleolaria cowlitziana Groves, 1994
- Nucleolaria granulata (Pease, 1863)
- Nucleolaria nucleus (Linnaeus, 1758)
- Staphylaea soloensis (Schilder, 1937)
