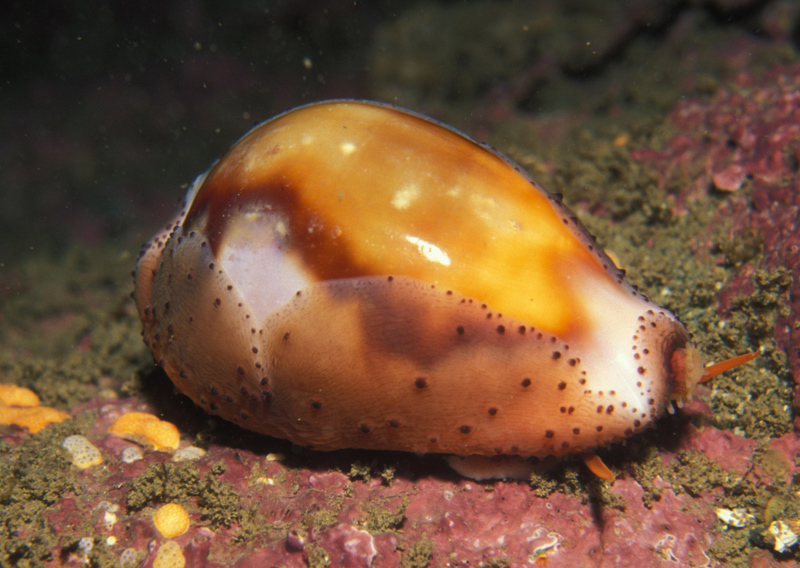
- A live Neobernaya spadicea, in situ, mantle partly extended, head end to the right
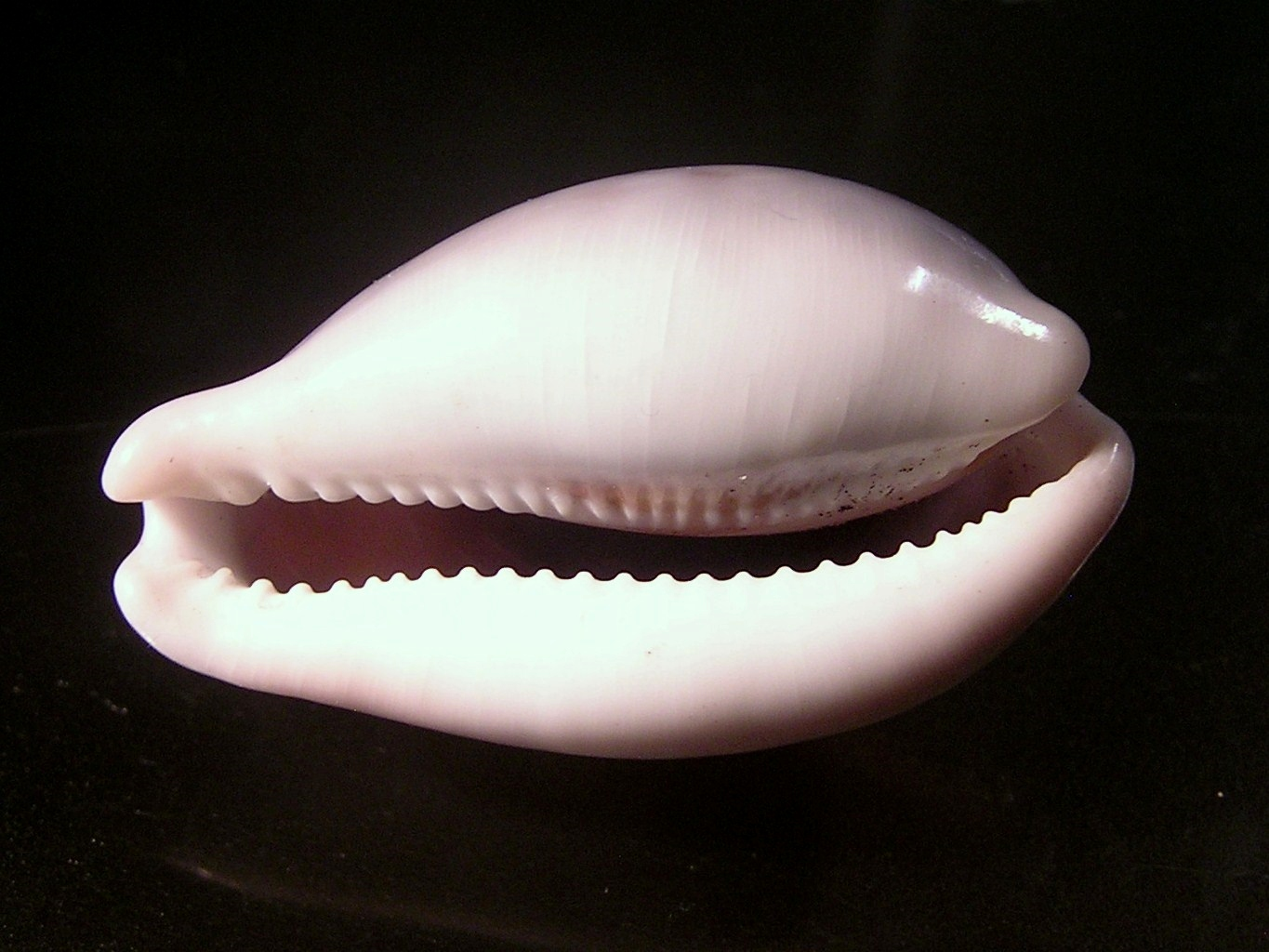
- An apertural view of a shell of the species, anterior end to the left

Scientific classification
- Kingdom: Animalia
- Phylum: Mollusca
- Class: Gastropoda
- Subclass: Caenogastropoda
- Order: Littorinimorpha
- Family: Cypraeidae
- Genus: Neobernaya
- Species: N. spadicea

Binomial name
- Neobernaya spadicea (Swainson, 1823)

Synonyms
- Cypraea spadicea (Swainson, 1823); Zonaria spadicea (Swainson, 1823); Cypraea (Luponia) spadicea (Swainson, 1823); Cypraea fernandoensis Arnold, 1907

= Neobernaya spadicea =

Species of gastropod

Neobernaya spadicea, common name the chestnut cowrie, is a species of sea snail in the cowrie family, Cypraeidae. Chestnut cowries can be found in the eastern Pacific Ocean, from central California to Baja California. The chestnut cowrie has a highly glossy shell due to an enamel that is secreted from its mantle.

== Distribution and habitat ==
The chestnut cowrie is the only species of cowrie in the eastern Pacific Ocean. It can be found in intertidal zones from Monterey, California to Isla Cedros, Baja California. It is common in Southern California, specifically around the Channel Islands. Chestnut cowries are rare in the portion of their range that is north of Santa Barbara, California.

Chestnut cowries live in kelp beds and rocky surfaces in intertidal and subtidal zones, to a depth of 45 m. Chestnut cowries are often found under rocks and protected crevices.

== Description ==
The top of the shell displays a large irregularly shaped caramel colored spot, with a dark brown border. The rest of the shell is white, including the bottom. There is a narrow aperture with small teeth that spans the length of the underside of the shell. The shell can grow until the cowrie reaches its adult form, then it stops. When undisturbed, their orange spotted mantle extends around the outside of the shell; when fully extended it can completely cover the shell. The shell is glossy due to an enamel that is secreted from the edges of the mantle. Retracting and extending the mantle acts as a buffer, shining the shell while depositing new enamel. The foot of this species is white. The adult shell of this species ranges in size from 40 to 65 mm.

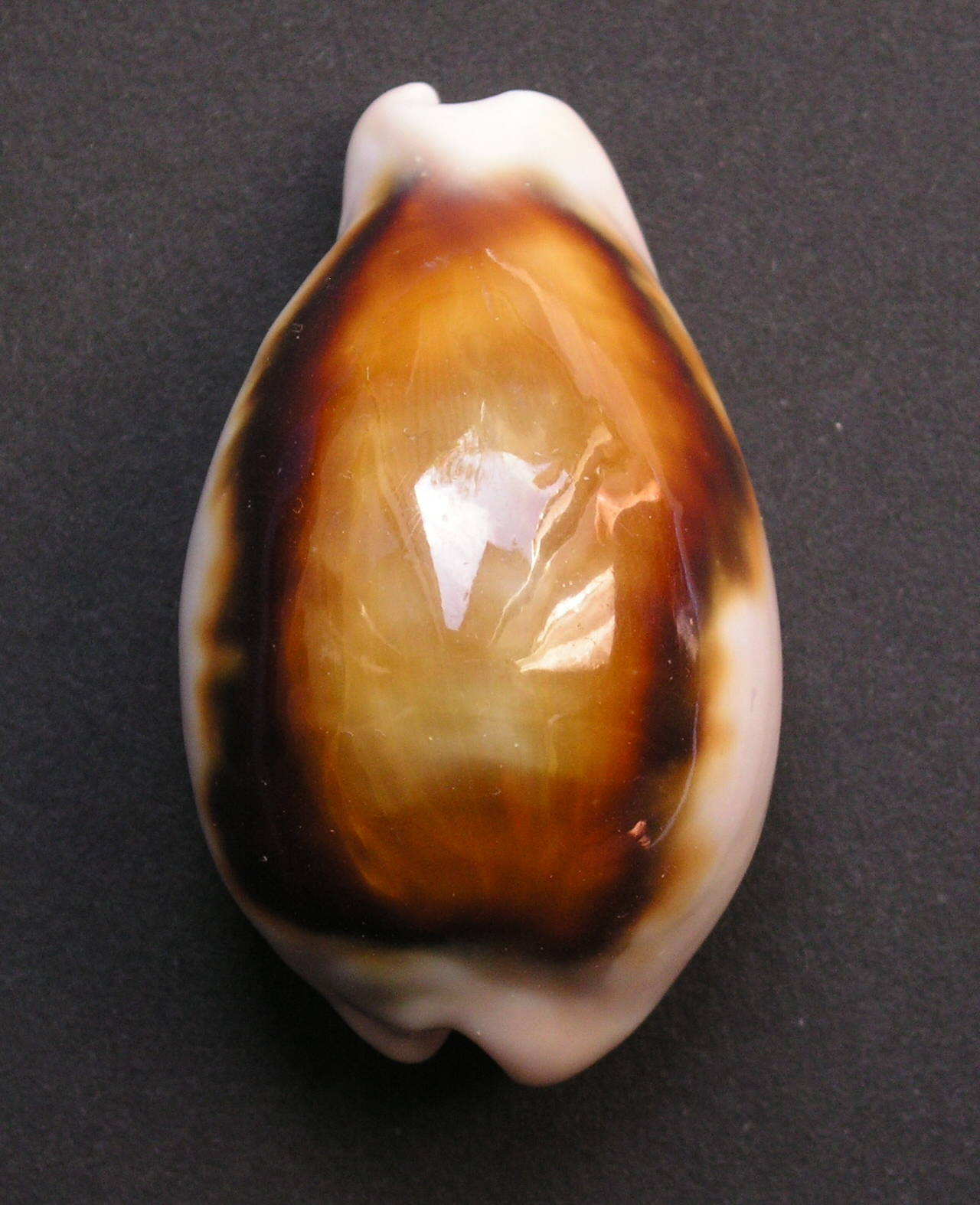
Dorsal view of a shell, anterior end to the top

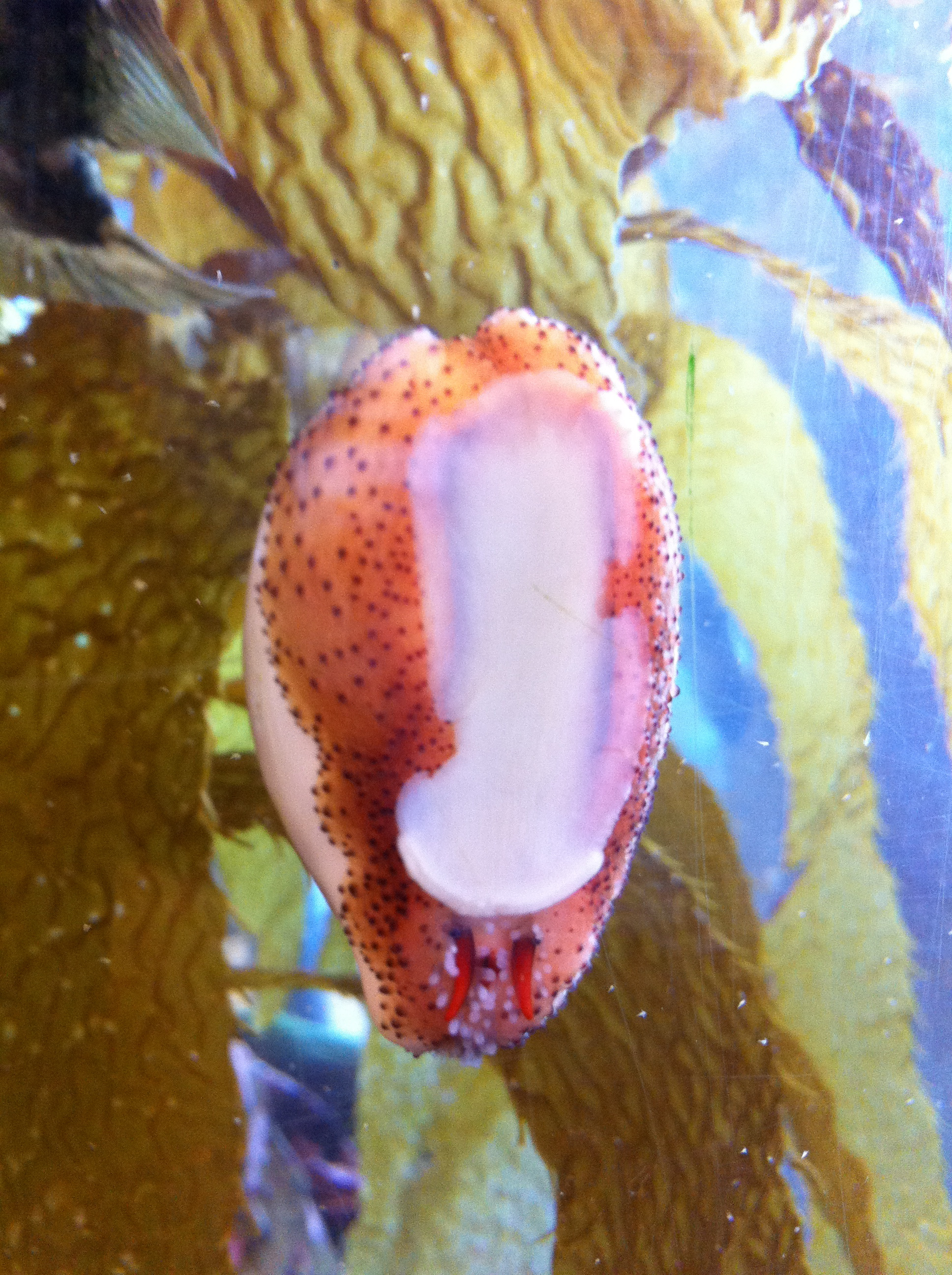
Ventral view of live specimen on aquarium glass, anterior end to the bottom

== Ecology ==
=== Diet ===
The chestnut cowrie is a scavenger and carnivore; common food items include anemones, sponges, tunicates, eggs, and dead organisms. This species appears to be an opportunistic feeder that consumes a wide variety of organic matter, including plants and detritus.

=== Reproduction ===
Chestnut cowries lay batches of eggs during the summer months. Each batch consists of approximately 100 egg capsules with each egg capsule containing several hundred eggs.
