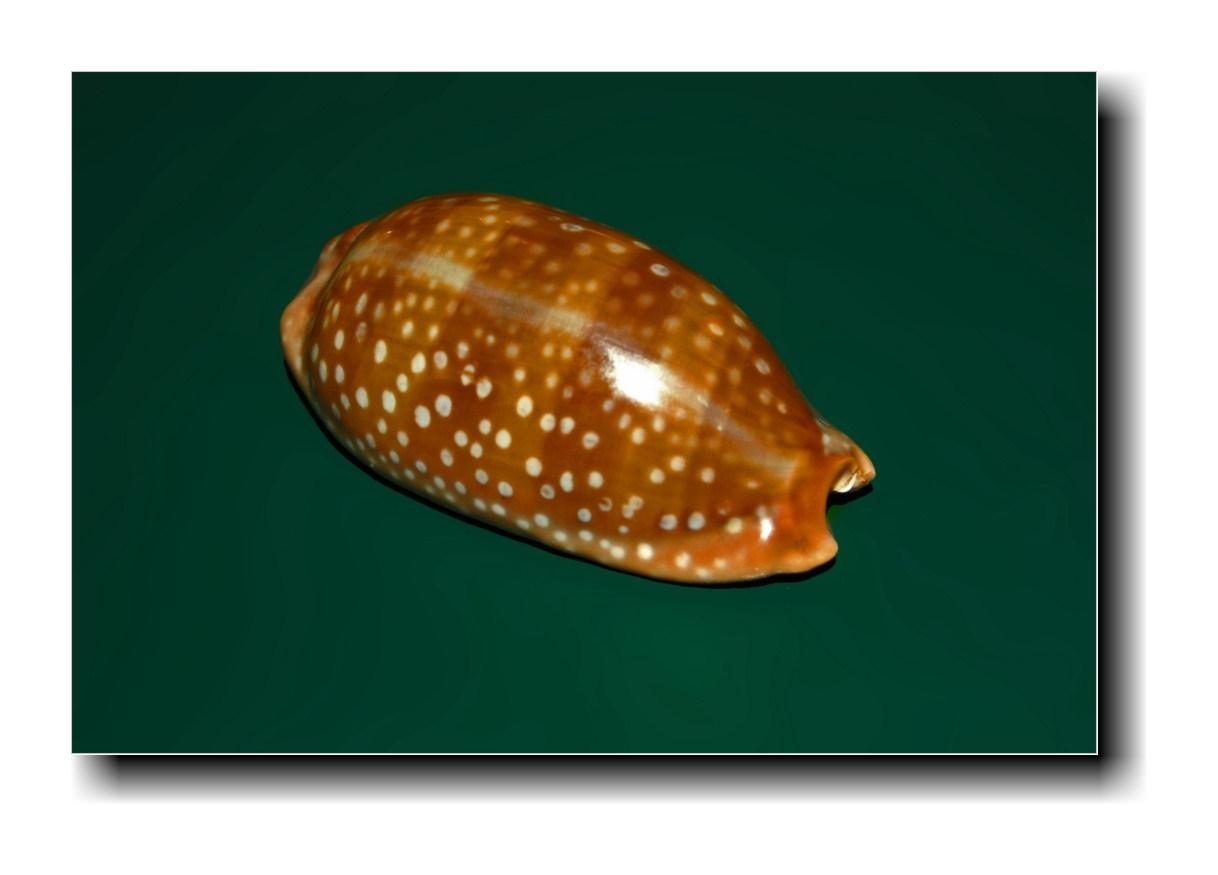
- A shell of Macrocypraea cervinetta from Panama, dorsal view, anterior end towards the right

Scientific classification
- Kingdom: Animalia
- Phylum: Mollusca
- Class: Gastropoda
- Subclass: Caenogastropoda
- Order: Littorinimorpha
- Family: Cypraeidae
- Genus: Macrocypraea
- Species: M. cervinetta

Binomial name
- Macrocypraea cervinetta Kiener, 1843

Synonyms
- Cypraea cervinetta Kiener 1843

= Macrocypraea cervinetta =

Species of gastropod

Macrocypraea cervinetta, the little deer cowry, is a species of sea snail, a cowry, a marine gastropod mollusk in the family Cypraeidae, the cowries.

Subspecies

- Macrocypraea cervinetta californica Lorenz, 2017
- Macrocypraea cervinetta cervinetta (Kiener, 1844)

== Description ==
The shells reaches about 40–110 millimetres (1.6–4.3 in) of length, with a width of about 15–50 millimetres (0.59–1.97 in). The shape of this cowry is elongated, its basic colour is light brown, with small whitish ocellated spots on the dorsum and dark brown apertural teeth. The dorsum shows also a few trasversal clearer bands and a longitudinal line.

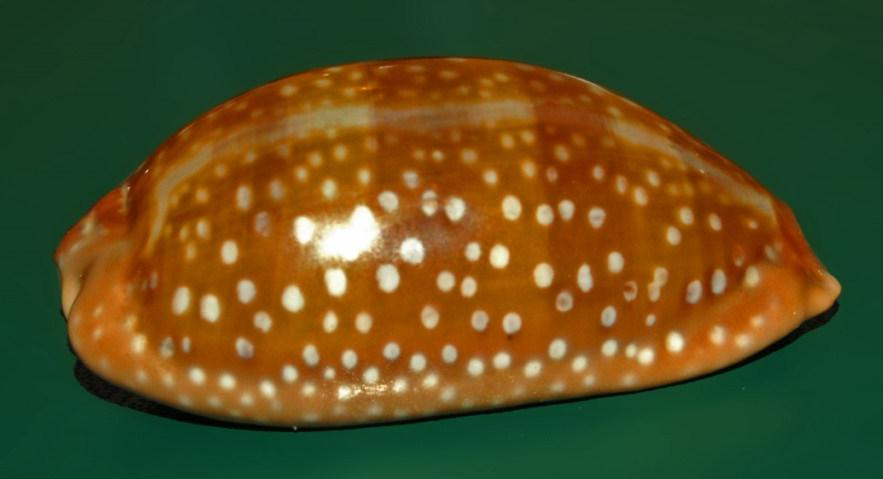
Macrocypraea cervinetta, side view

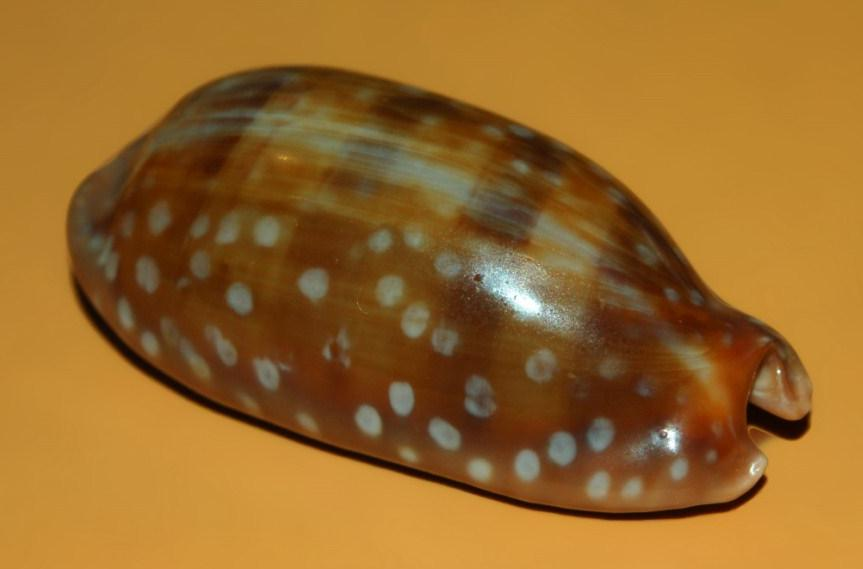
Macrocypraea cervinetta var. nana, Panama

== Distribution ==
This species occurs in the Eastern Pacific Ocean from the Gulf of California to Peru including the Galapagos Islands. It is mainly encountered at low tide under corals and rocks.
