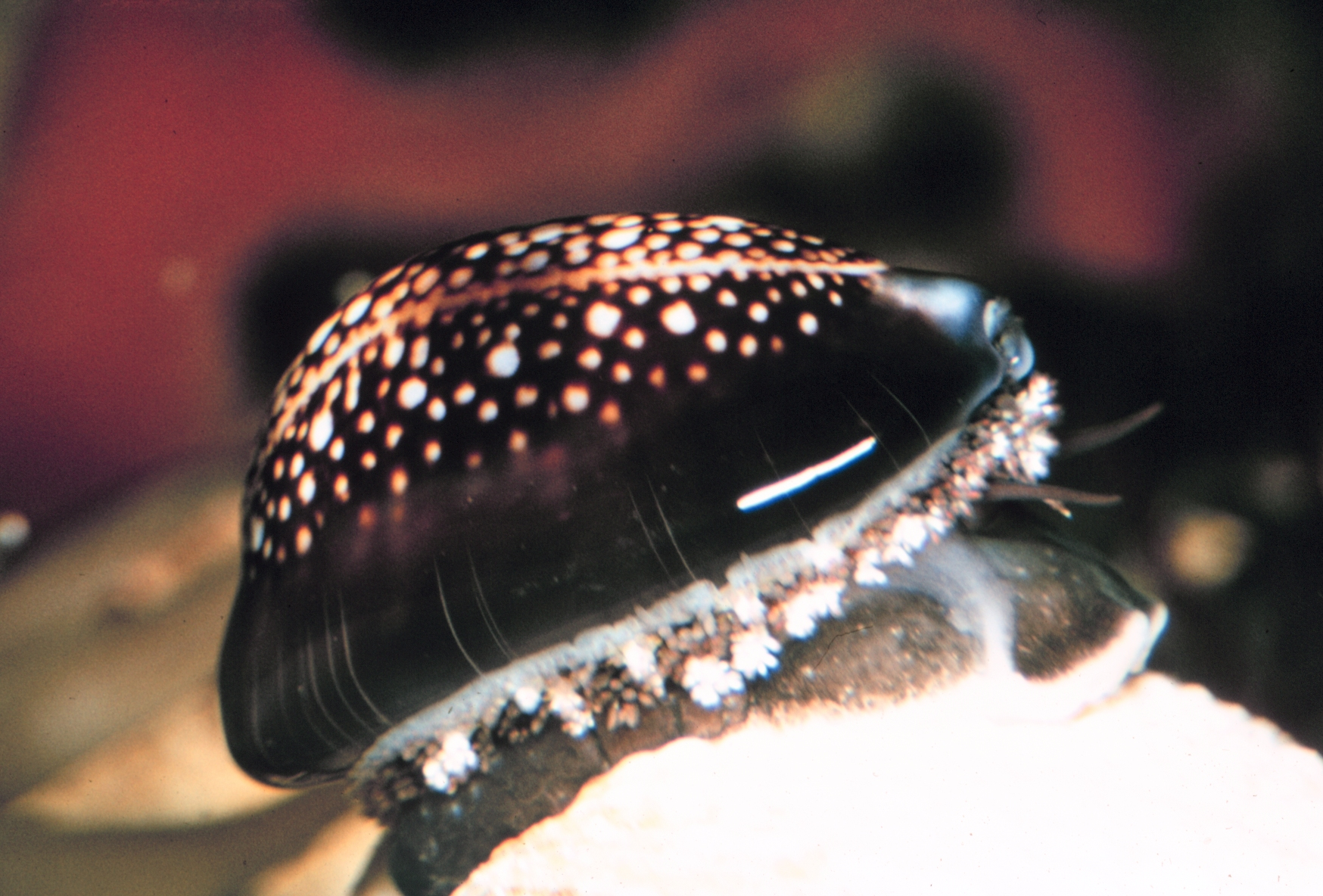
- Cowries are generally seen on rocky areas of the sea bed.

Scientific classification
- Kingdom: Animalia
- Phylum: Mollusca
- Class: Gastropoda
- Subclass: Caenogastropoda
- Order: Littorinimorpha
- Superfamily: Cypraeoidea
- Family: Cypraeidae

= Cowrie =

Common name for a group of sea snails

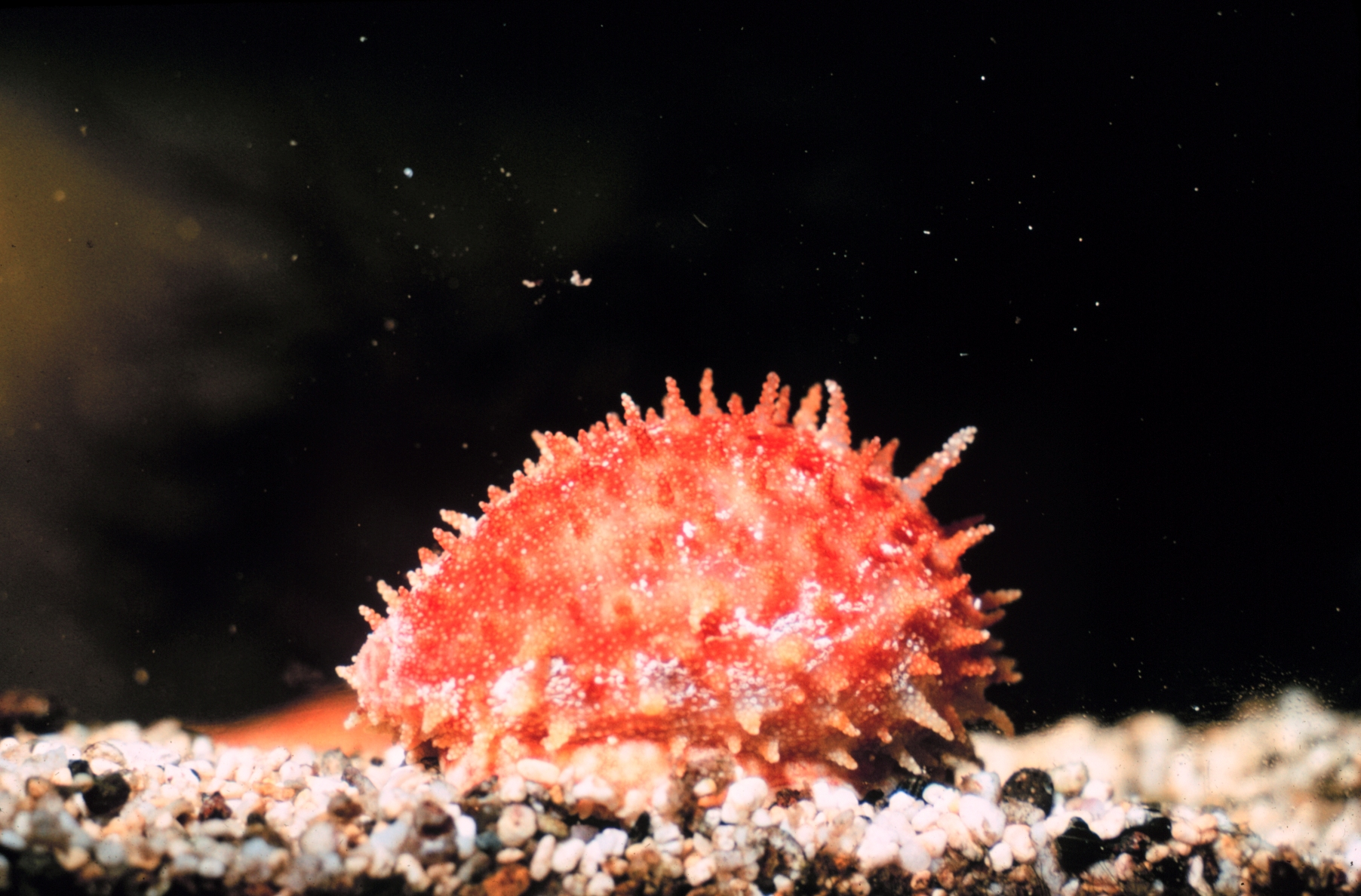
Cowrie (Cypraea chinensis) with fully extended mantle

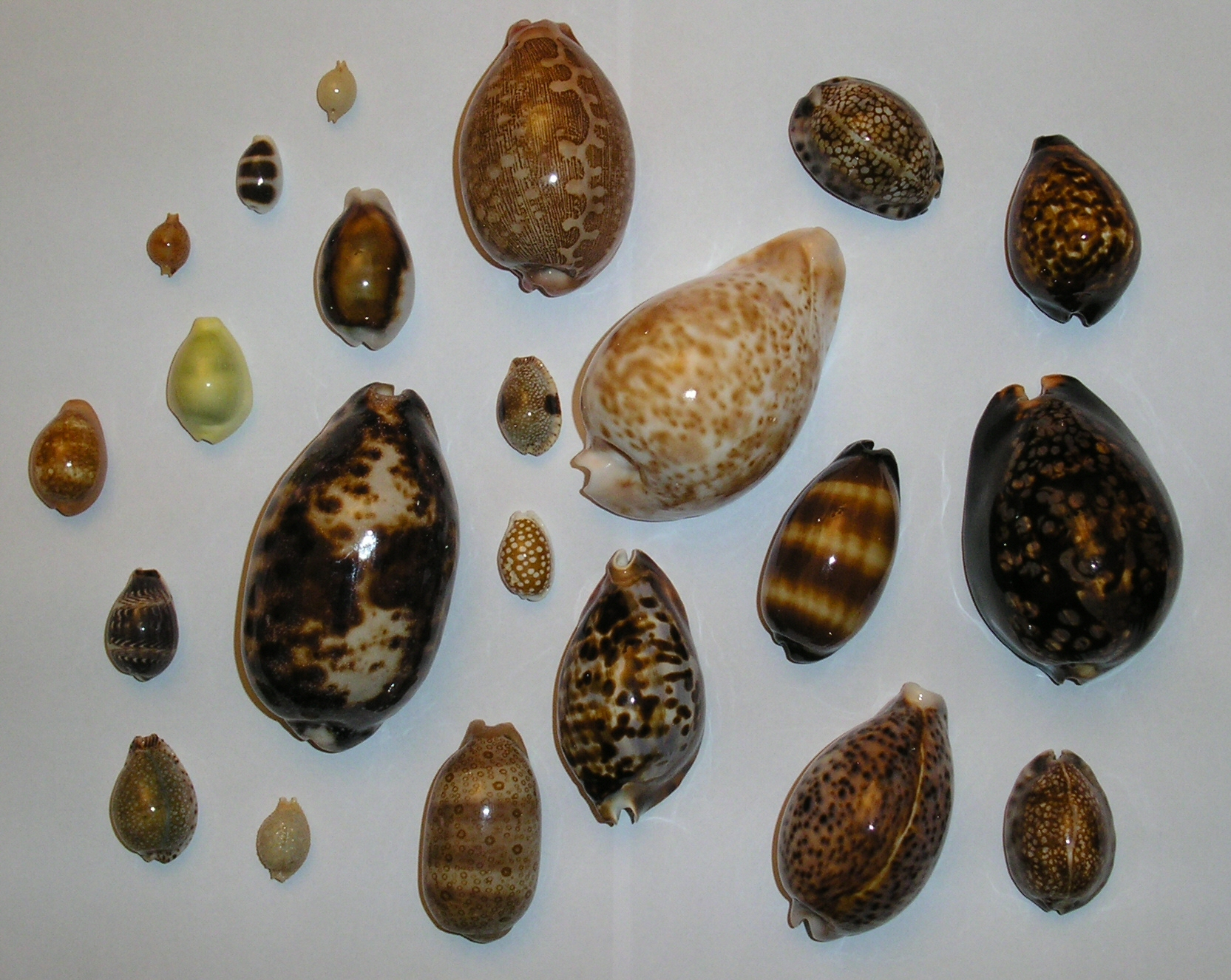
Shells of various species of cowrie; all but one have their anterior ends pointing towards the top of this image.

Cowrie or cowry (pl. cowries) is the common name for a group of small to large sea snails in the family Cypraeidae.

Cowrie shells have held cultural, economic, and ornamental significance in various cultures. The cowrie was the shell most widely used worldwide as shell money. It is most abundant in the Indian Ocean and was collected near the Maldive Islands, Sri Lanka and the Indian Malabar coast, Borneo and other East Indian islands, Maluku in the Pacific, Papua New Guinea, and various parts of the African coast from Ras Hafun, in Somalia, to Mozambique. Cowrie shell money was important in the trade networks of Africa, South Asia, and East Asia.

In the United States and Mexico, cowrie species inhabit the waters off Central California to Baja California (the chestnut cowrie is the only cowrie species native to the eastern Pacific Ocean off the coast of the United States; further south, off the coast of Mexico, Central America and Peru, little deer cowrie habitat can be found; and further into the Pacific from Central America, the Pacific habitat range of Money Cowrie can be reached) as well as the waters south of the Southeastern United States.

Some species in the family Ovulidae are also often referred to as cowries. In the British Isles, the local Trivia species (family Triviidae, species Trivia monacha and Trivia arctica) are sometimes called cowries. The Ovulidae and the Triviidae are other families within the Cypraeoidea, the superfamily of cowries and their close relatives.

== Etymology ==
The word "cowrie" comes from Hindi कौडि (kaudi), which is itself derived from Sanskrit कपर्द (kaparda).

The term "porcelain" derives from the old Italian term for the cowrie shell (porcellana) due to their similar appearance.

== Shell description ==
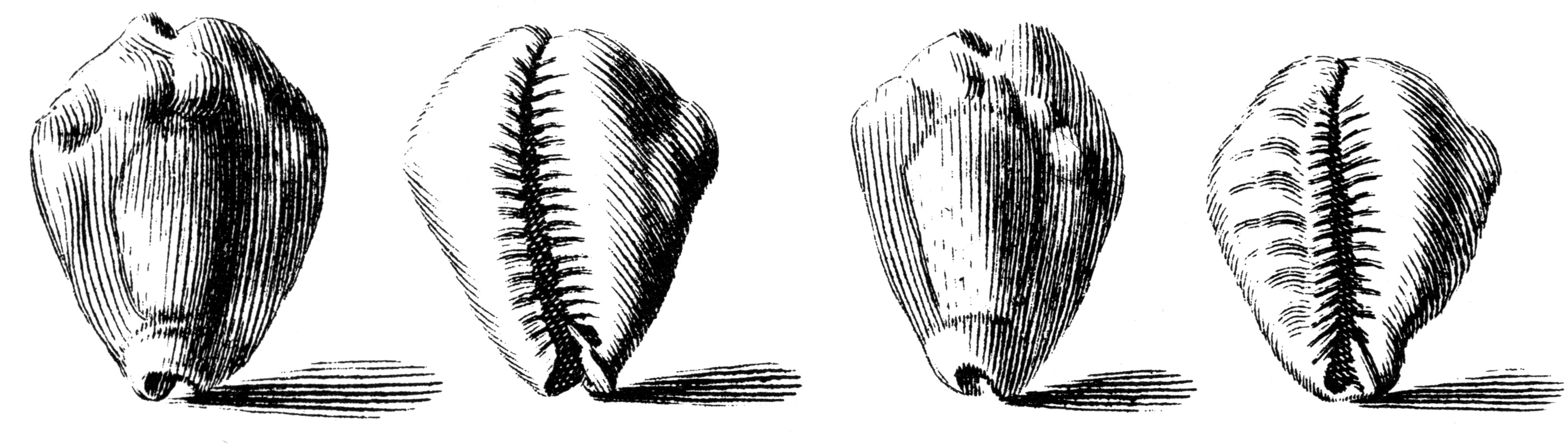
A 1742 drawing of shells of the money cowrie, Monetaria moneta

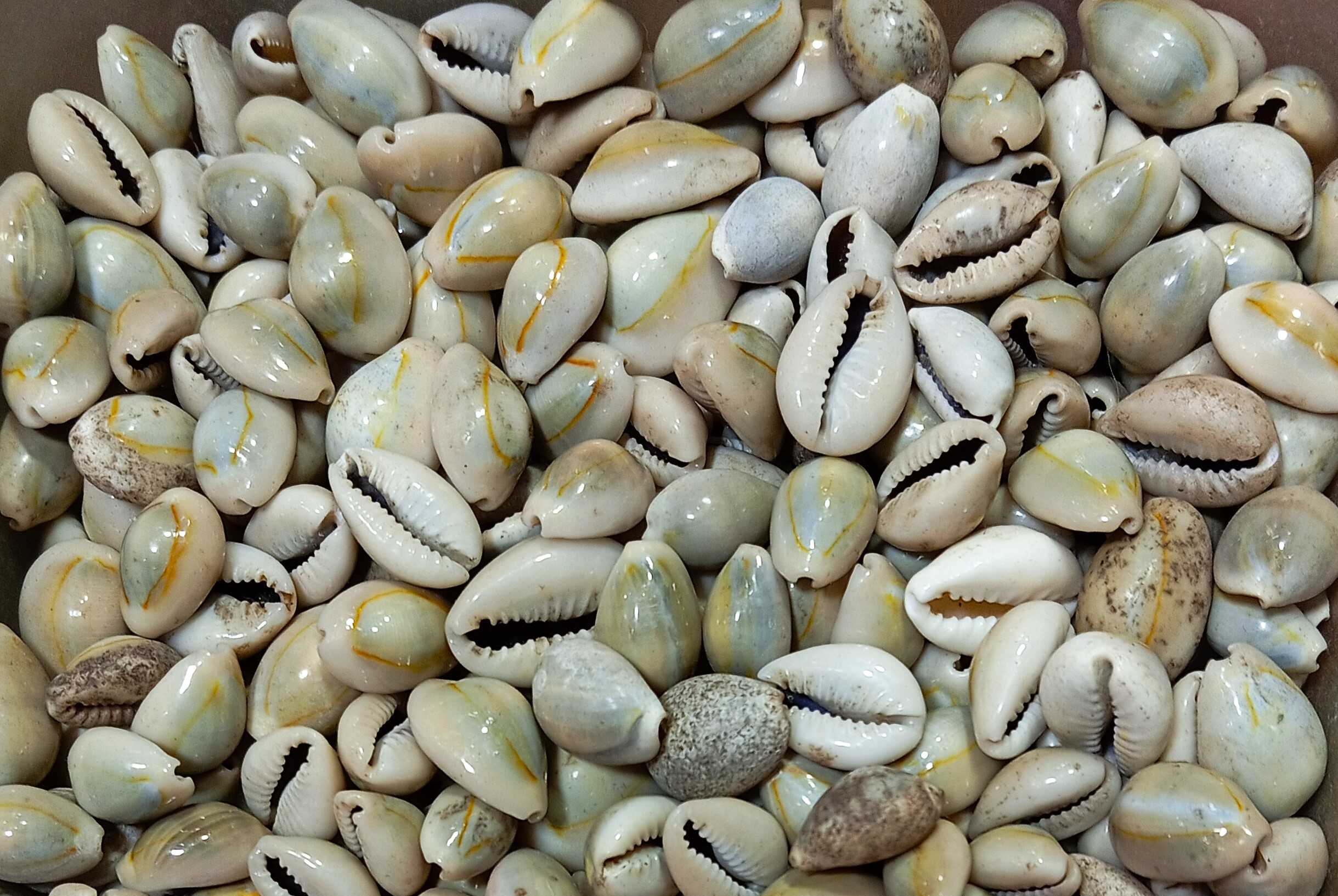
Cowrie shells

The shells of cowries are usually smooth and shiny and more-or-less egg-shaped. The round side of the shell is called the dorsal face, whereas the flat underside is called the ventral face, which shows a long, narrow, slit-like opening (aperture), which is often toothed at the edges. The narrower end of the egg-shaped cowrie shell is the anterior end and the broader end of the shell is called the posterior. The spire of the shell is not visible in the adult shell of most species, but is visible in juveniles, which have a different shape from the adults.

Nearly all cowries have a porcelain-like shine, with some exceptions such as Hawaii's granulated cowrie, Nucleolaria granulata. Many have colorful patterns. Lengths range from 5 mm (0.2 in) for some species up to 19 cm (7.5 in) for the Atlantic deer cowrie, Macrocypraea cervus.

== Human use ==
=== Monetary use ===
Cowrie shells, especially Monetaria moneta, were used for centuries as currency by native Africans. Cowrie shells were well suited for use as currency because they are durable, easy to handle, portable, lacking in other uses, and hard to counterfeit. (The money cowrie was almost impossible to counterfeit until the late 19th century.) Starting more than 3000 years ago, cowrie shells or their copies were used as Chinese currency. They were also used as means of exchange in India.

The Classical Chinese character for "money" (貝) originated as a stylized drawing of a Maldivian cowrie shell. Words and characters concerning money, property, or wealth usually have this as a radical. Before the Spring and Autumn period, the cowrie was used as a type of trade token awarding access to a feudal lord's resources to a worthy vassal.

After the 1500s, the shell's use as currency became even more common. Western nations, chiefly through the slave trade, introduced huge numbers of Maldivian cowries in Africa. In parts of British West Africa, cowries remained accepted for tax payments until the early 20th century, and their use as currency in unregulated environments persisted until the 1960s. The national currency of Ghana introduced in 1965, the cedi, was named after cowrie shells.

=== Ritual use ===
Cowrie shells are used in divination amongst the Yoruba people of West Africa (cf. Ifá and the annual customs of Dahomey of Benin).

The indigenous Ojibwe people of North America use cowrie shells called miigis shells or whiteshells in Midewiwin ceremonies, and the Whiteshell Provincial Park in Manitoba, Canada, is named after this type of shell. Some debate has arisen about how the Ojibwe traded for or found these shells, so far inland and so far north, very distant from the natural habitat. Oral stories and birch bark scrolls seem to indicate that the shells were found in the ground, or washed up on the shores of lakes or rivers. Finding the cowrie shells so far inland could indicate the previous use of them by an earlier group in the area, who may have obtained them through an extensive trade network in the past.

In eastern India, particularly in West Bengal, it is given as a token price for the ferry ride of the departed soul to cross the river "Vaitarani". Cowries are used during cremation. They are also used in the worship of the goddess Laxmi.

In Brazil, as a result of the Atlantic slave trade from Africa, cowrie shells (called búzios) are also used to consult the Orixás divinities and hear their replies.

Cowrie shells were among the devices used for divination by the Kaniyar Panicker astrologers of Kerala, India.

In certain parts of Africa, cowries were prized charms, and they were said to be associated with fecundity, sexual pleasure, and good luck.

In predynastic Egypt and Neolithic Southern Levant, cowrie shells were placed in the graves of young girls. The modified Levantine cowries were discovered ritually arranged around the skull in female burials. During the Bronze Age, cowries became more common as funerary goods, also associated with burials of women and children. The cowroid was an Egyptian seal amulet imitating the cowrie shell. Their imitations in stone or faience appear in the early second millennium BC.

=== Jewelry ===
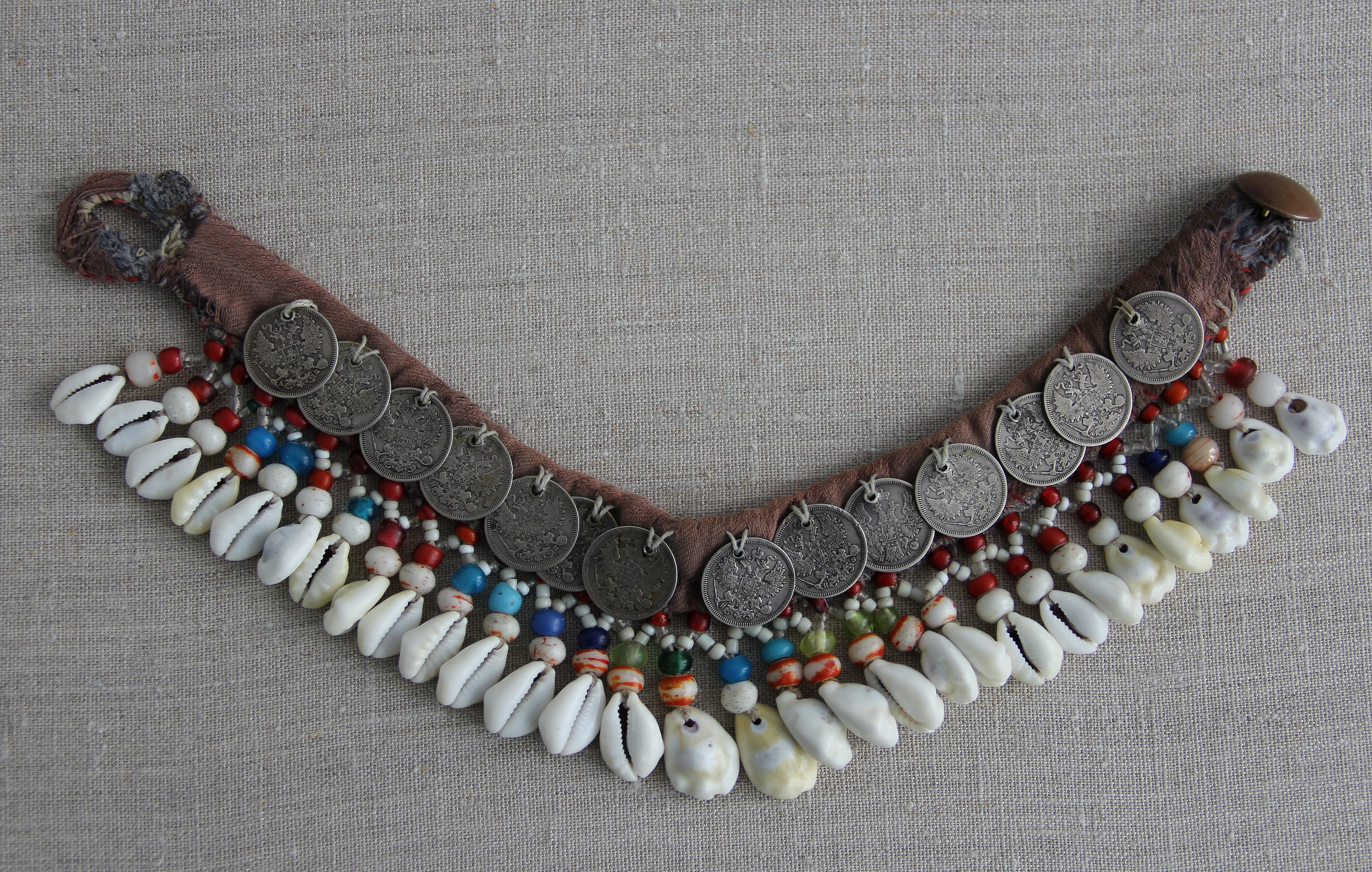
Traditional Chuvash necklace made from silver coins, cowrie shells, and beads

Cowrie shells are also worn as jewelry or otherwise used as ornaments or charms. In Mende, Kikuyu culture, cowrie shells are viewed as symbols of womanhood, fertility, birth, and wealth. Its underside is supposed, by one modern ethnographic author, to represent a vulva or an eye.

On the Fiji Islands, a shell of the golden cowrie or bulikula, Cypraea aurantium, was drilled at the ends and worn on a string around the neck by chieftains as a badge of rank. The women of Tuvalu use cowrie and other shells in traditional handicrafts.

=== Games and gambling ===
Cowrie shells are sometimes used in a way similar to dice, e.g., in board games such as Pachisi and Ashta Chamma. A number of shells (six or seven in Pachisi) are thrown, with those landing aperture upwards indicating the actual number rolled.

In Nepal, cowries are used for a gambling game, where 16 cowries are tossed by four different bettors (and subbettors under them). This game is usually played at homes and in public during the Hindu festival of Tihar or Deepawali. In the same festival, these shells are also worshiped as a symbol of the goddess Lakshmi and wealth.

=== Other ===
Large cowrie shells such as those of Cypraea tigris have been used in Europe in the recent past as a darning egg over which sock heels were stretched. The cowrie's smooth surface allows the needle to be positioned under the cloth more easily.

In the 1940s and 1950s, small cowry shells were used as a teaching aid in children's schools, e.g counting, adding, and subtracting.

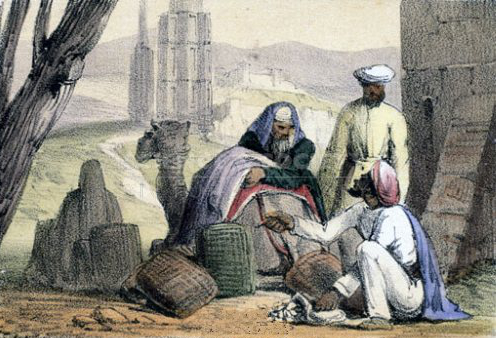
A print from 1845 shows cowrie shells being used as money by an Arab trader.

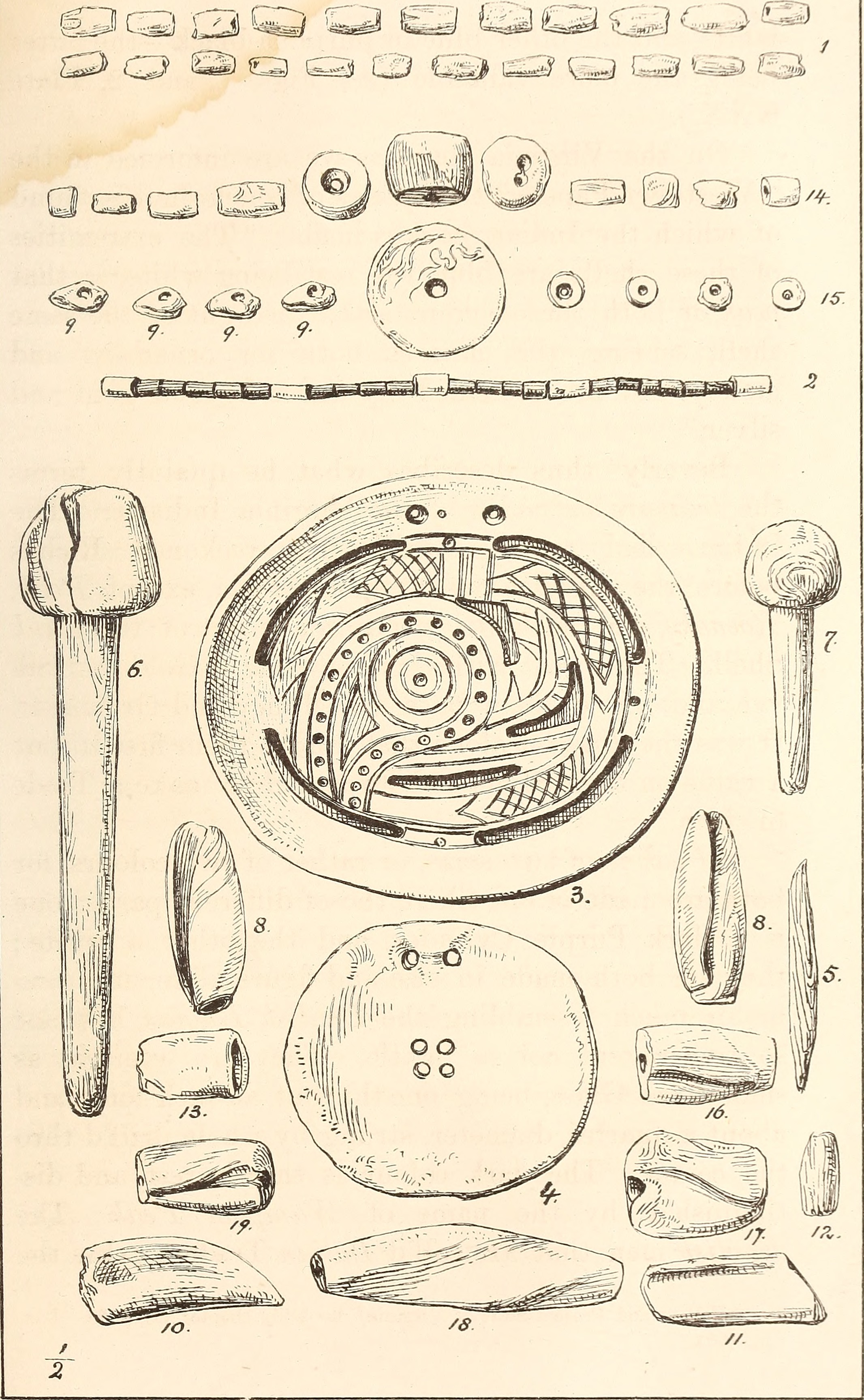
Antiquities of Native Americans, particularly of the Georgia tribes (1873)

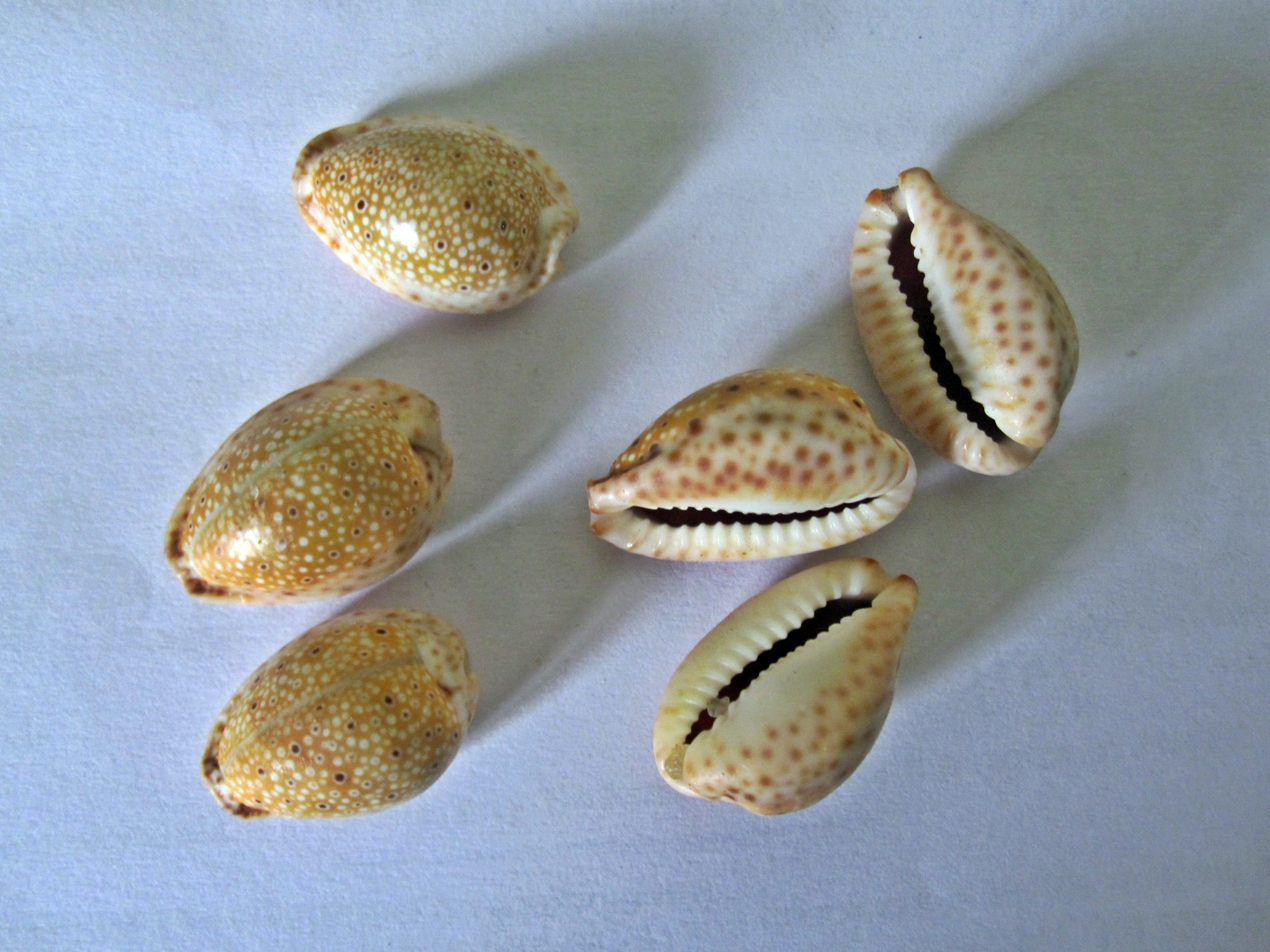
Cowrie shells used as dice, showing a roll of a three

== See also ==
- Shell money
  - Wampum
- The Tale of the Bamboo Cutter
