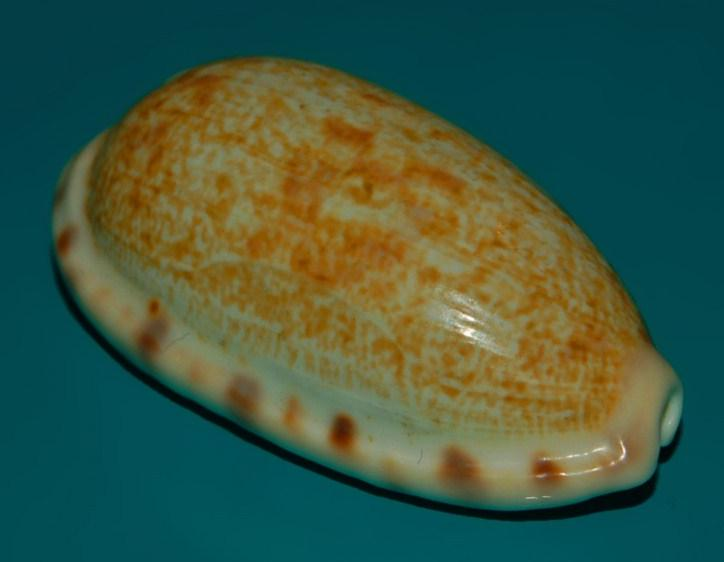
- Blasicrura pellucens

Scientific classification
- Kingdom: Animalia
- Phylum: Mollusca
- Class: Gastropoda
- Subclass: Caenogastropoda
- Order: Littorinimorpha
- Family: Cypraeidae
- Genus: Blasicrura; Iredale, 1930

Type species
- Blasicrura pallidula rhinoceros Souverbie, S.M., 1865

= Blasicrura =

Genus of gastropods

Blasicrura is a genus of sea snails, marine gastropod mollusks in the family Cypraeidae, the cowries.

== Species ==
Species within the genus Blasicrura include according to the World Register of Marine Species (WoRMS)

- Blasicrura interrupta (Gray, 1824)
- Blasicrura pallidula (Gaskoin, 1849)
  - Blasicrura pallidula luchuana Kuroda, 1960
  - Blasicrura pallidula pallidula (Gaskoin, 1849-a)
- Blasicrura summersi (Schilder, 1958)

The Indo-Pacific Molluscan Database also includes the following names in current use

- Blasicrura luchuana (Kuroda, 1960)
- Blasicrura quadrimaculata (Gray, 1824): accepted by WoRMS as Eclogavena quadrimaculata (J.E. Gray, 1824)

Species brought into synonymy

- Blasicrura alisonae Burgess, 1983: synonym of Blasicrura pellucens (Melvill, 1888)
- Blasicrura coxeni (Cox, 1873): synonym of Eclogavena coxeni (Cox, 1873)
- Blasicrura dani Beals, 2002: synonym of Eclogavena dani (Beals, 2002)
- Blasicrura dayritiana (Cate, 1963): synonym of Eclogavena dayritiana (Cate, 1963)
- Blasicrura goodalli (Sowerby I, 1832): synonym of Bistolida goodallii (Sowerby I, 1832)
- Blasicrura hirundo (Linnaeus, 1758): synonym of Bistolida hirundo (Linnaeus, 1758)
- Blasicrura kieneri (Hidalgo, 1906): synonym of Bistolida kieneri (Hidalgo, 1906)
- Blasicrura latior (Melvill, 1888): synonym of Talostolida latior (Melvill, 1888)
- Blasicrura owenii (Sowerby I, 1837): synonym of Bistolida owenii (Sowerby I, 1837)
- Blasicrura pellucens (Melvill, 1888): synonym of Talostolida pellucens (Melvill, 1888)
- Blasicrura rashleighana (Melvill, 1888): synonym of Ovatipsa rashleighana (Melvill, 1888)
- Blasicrura stolida (Linnaeus, 1758) : synonym of Bistolida stolida (Linnaeus, 1758)
- Blasicrura subteres (Weinkauff, 1881): synonym of Talostolida subteres (Weinkauff, 1881)
- Blasicrura teres (Gmelin, 1791): synonym of Talostolida teres (Gmelin, 1791)
