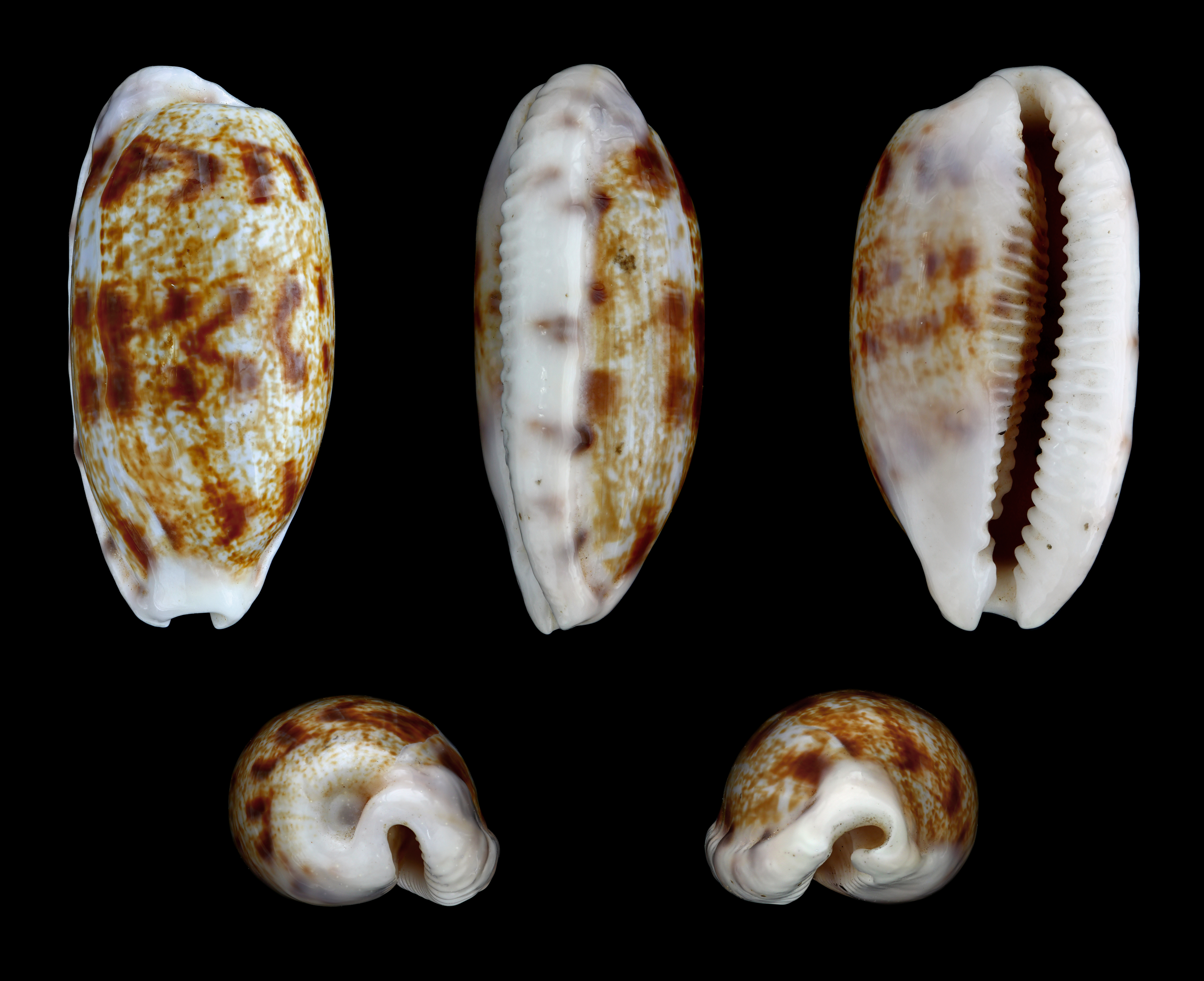
- Five views of a shell of Talostolida teres

Scientific classification
- Kingdom: Animalia
- Phylum: Mollusca
- Class: Gastropoda
- Subclass: Caenogastropoda
- Order: Littorinimorpha
- Family: Cypraeidae
- Subfamily: Erroneinae
- Tribe: Bistolidini
- Genus: Talostolida; Iredale, 1931

Type species
- Cypraea teres Gmelin, 1791

= Talostolida =

- A live individual of Talostolida teres

Genus of gastropods

Talostolida is a genus of sea snails, marine gastropod molluscs in the subfamily Erroneinae of the family Cypraeidae, the cowries.

== Species ==
Species within the genus Talostolida include:

- Talostolida latior (Melvill, 1888)
- Talostolida pellucens (Melvill, 1888)
- Talostolida subteres (Weinkauff, 1881)
- Talostolida teres (Gmelin, 1791)
- Talostolida violacincta (Lorenz, 2002)

Species brought into synonymy

- Talostolida natalensis (Heiman & Mienis, 2002): synonym of Talostolida pellucens pellucens (Melvill, 1888)
- Talostolida pseudoteres Lorenz & Barbier, 1992 synonym of Ovatipsa pseudoteres (Lorenz & Barbier, 1992)
- Talostolida rashleighana (Melvill, 1888): synonym of Ovatipsa rashleighana (Melvill, 1888)
