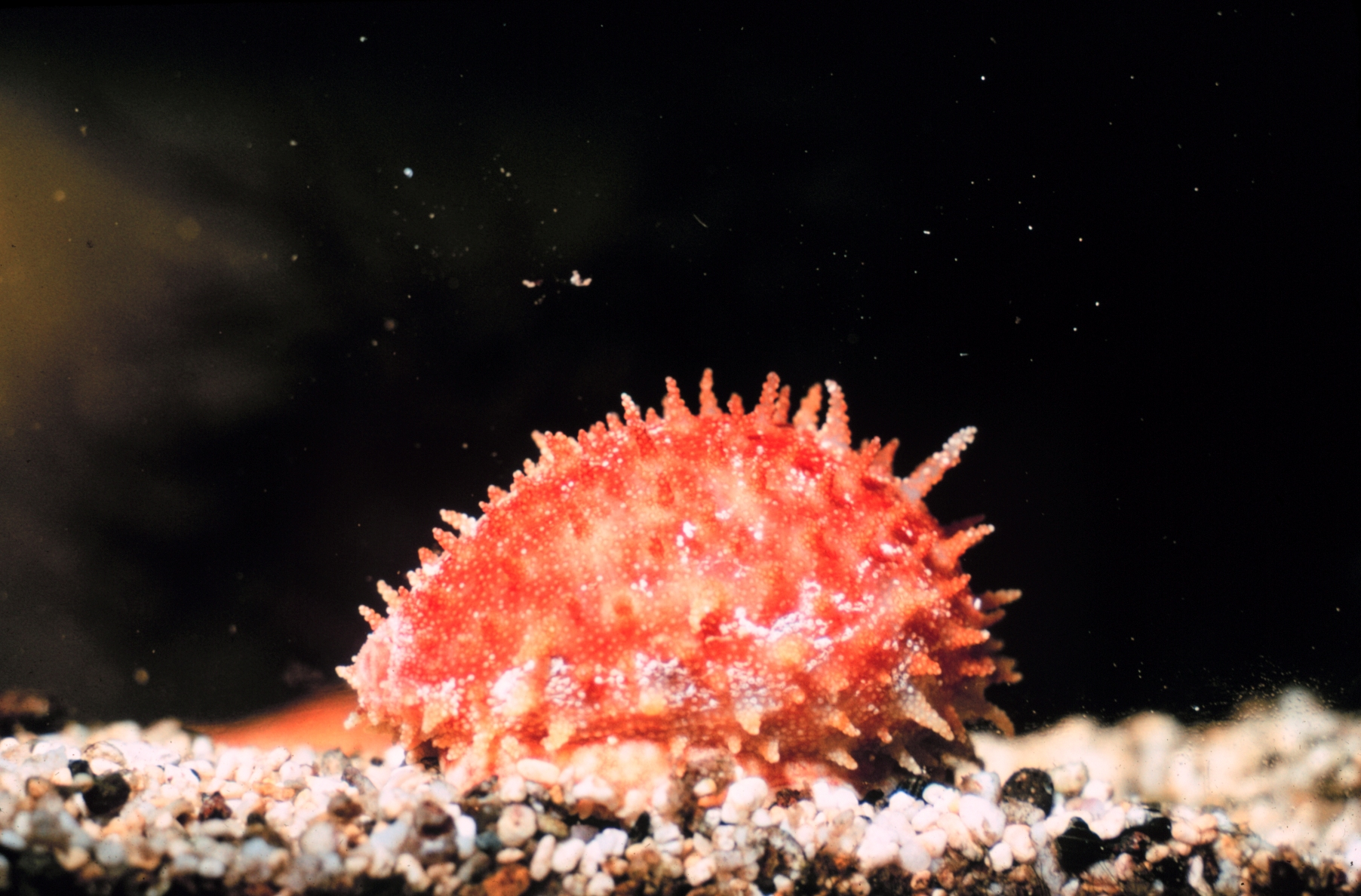
- A live Ovatipsa chinensis with its mantle fully extended
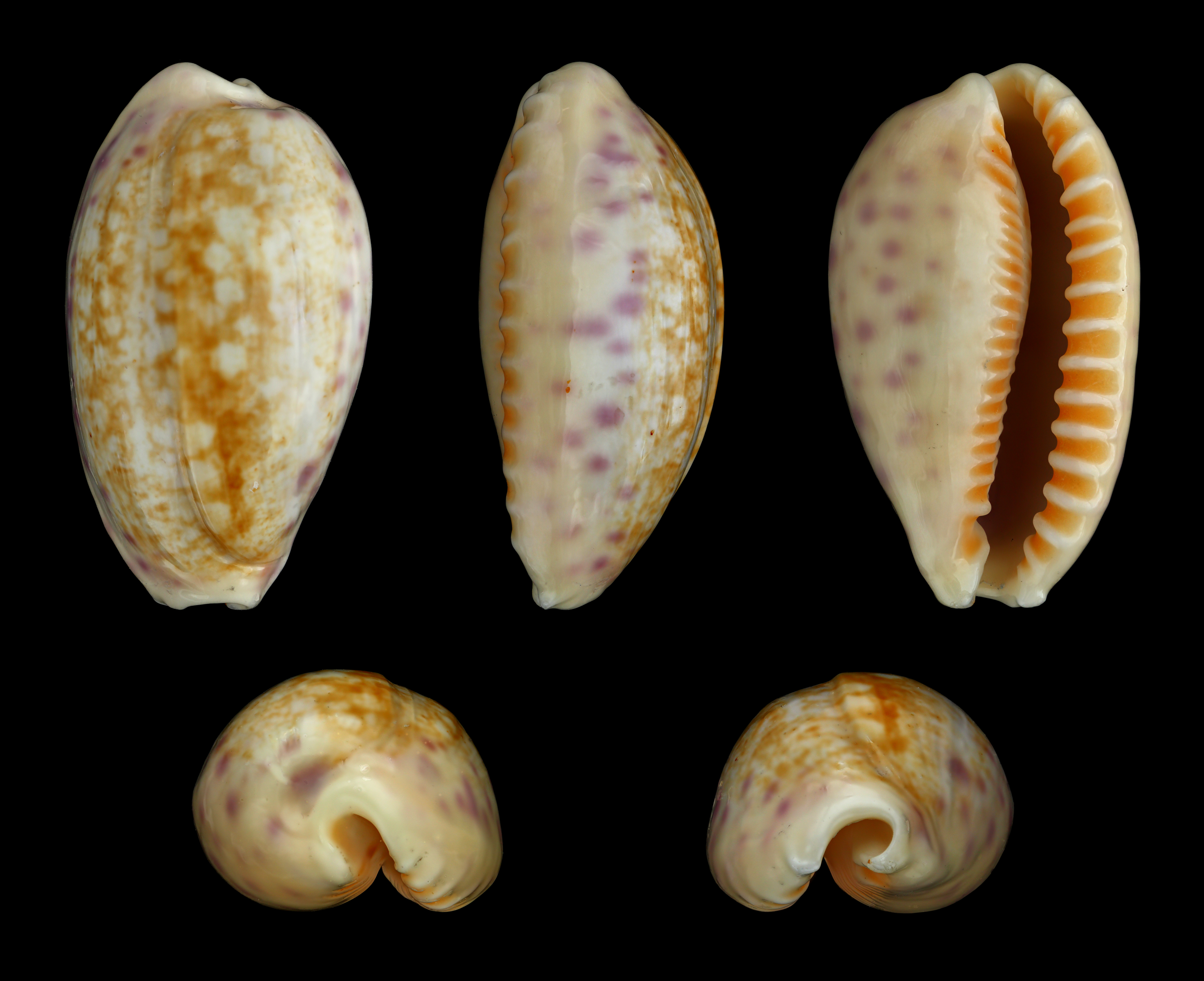
- Five views of a shell of Ovatipsa chinensis

Scientific classification
- Kingdom: Animalia
- Phylum: Mollusca
- Class: Gastropoda
- Subclass: Caenogastropoda
- Order: Littorinimorpha
- Family: Cypraeidae
- Genus: Ovatipsa; Iredale, 1931

= Ovatipsa =

Genus of gastropods

Ovatipsa is a genus of sea snails, marine gastropod mollusks in the family Cypraeidae, the cowries.

== Species ==
Species within the genus Ovatipsa include:

- Ovatipsa chinensis (Gmelin, 1791)
- Ovatipsa coloba (Melvill, 1888)
- Ovatipsa rashleighana (Melvill, 1888)
