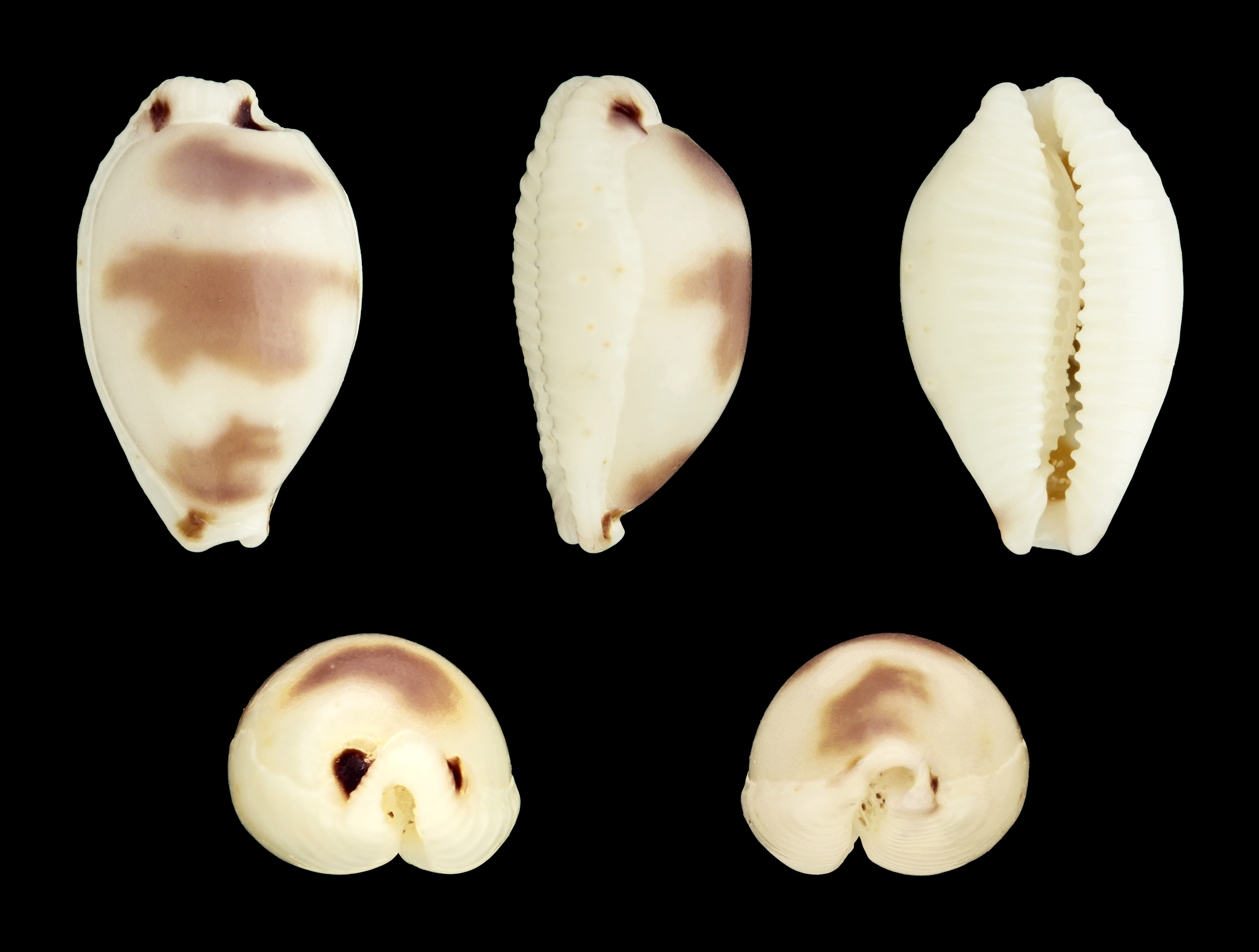

Scientific classification
- Kingdom: Animalia
- Phylum: Mollusca
- Class: Gastropoda
- Subclass: Caenogastropoda
- Order: Littorinimorpha
- Family: Cypraeidae
- Genus: Bistolida
- Species: B. ursellus

Binomial name
- Bistolida ursellus (Gmelin, 1791)

Synonyms
- Cypraea ursellus Gmelin, 1791 (basionym); Cypraea coffea Sowerby III, 1870

= Bistolida ursellus =

Species of gastropod

Bistolida ursellus is a species of sea snail, a cowry, a marine gastropod mollusc in the family Cypraeidae, the cowries.

== Subspecies and formae ==
- Bistolida ursellus amoeba (Schilder, F.A. & M. Schilder, 1938)
- Bistolida ursellus jomi C. P. Meyer & Lorenz, 2017
- Bistolida ursellus ursellus (Gmelin, 1791)

== Distribution ==
This species is found in the seas along the New Hebrides.
