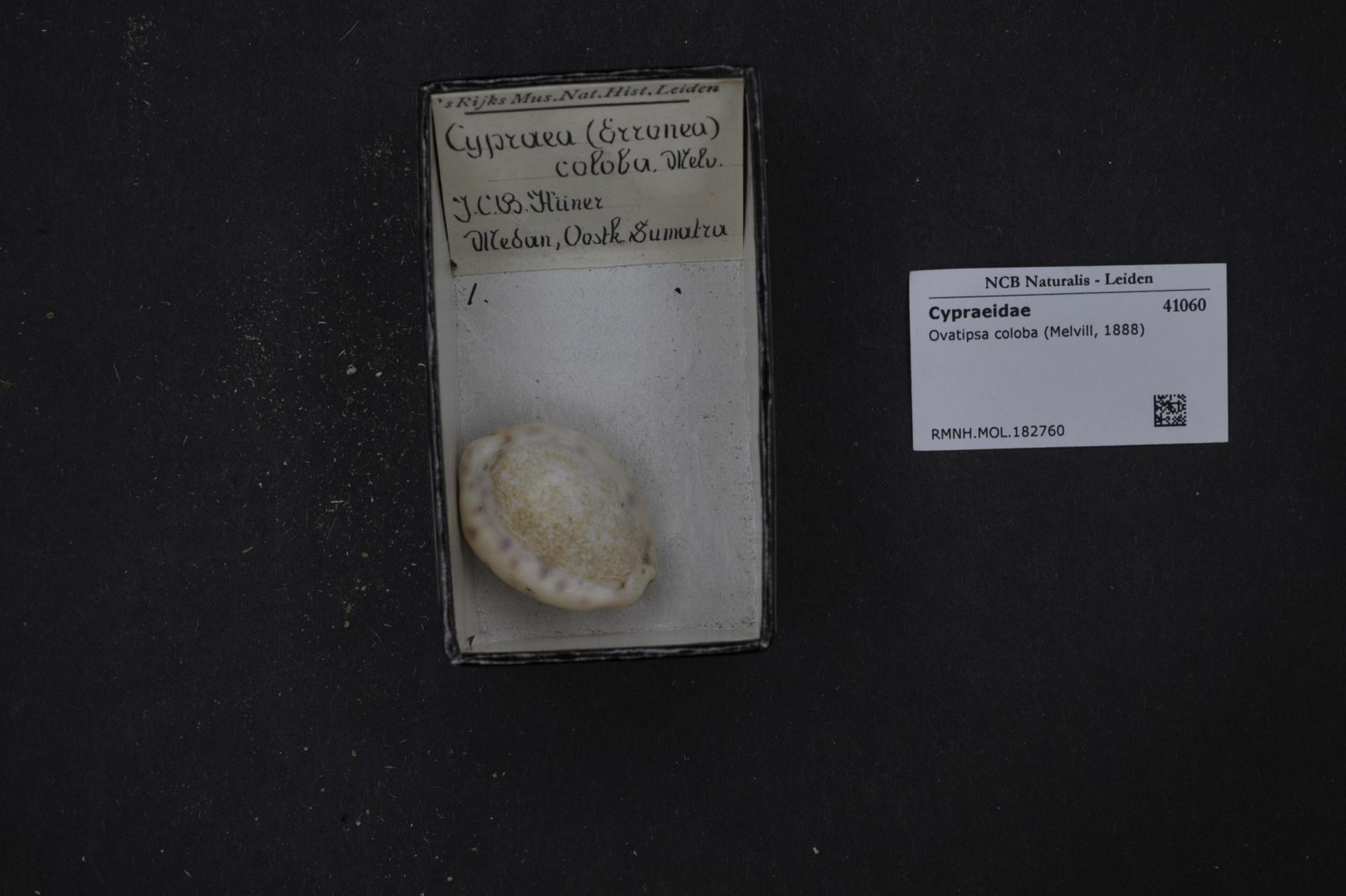

Scientific classification
- Kingdom: Animalia
- Phylum: Mollusca
- Class: Gastropoda
- Subclass: Caenogastropoda
- Order: Littorinimorpha
- Family: Cypraeidae
- Genus: Ovatipsa
- Species: O. coloba

Binomial name
- Ovatipsa coloba (Melvill, 1888)

Synonyms
- Cypraea coloba Melvill, 1888 (basionym)

= Ovatipsa coloba =

Species of gastropod

Ovatipsa coloba is a species of sea snail, a cowry, a marine gastropod mollusk in the family Cypraeidae, the cowries.

== Distribution ==
This species occurs in the Indian Ocean along Chagos.
