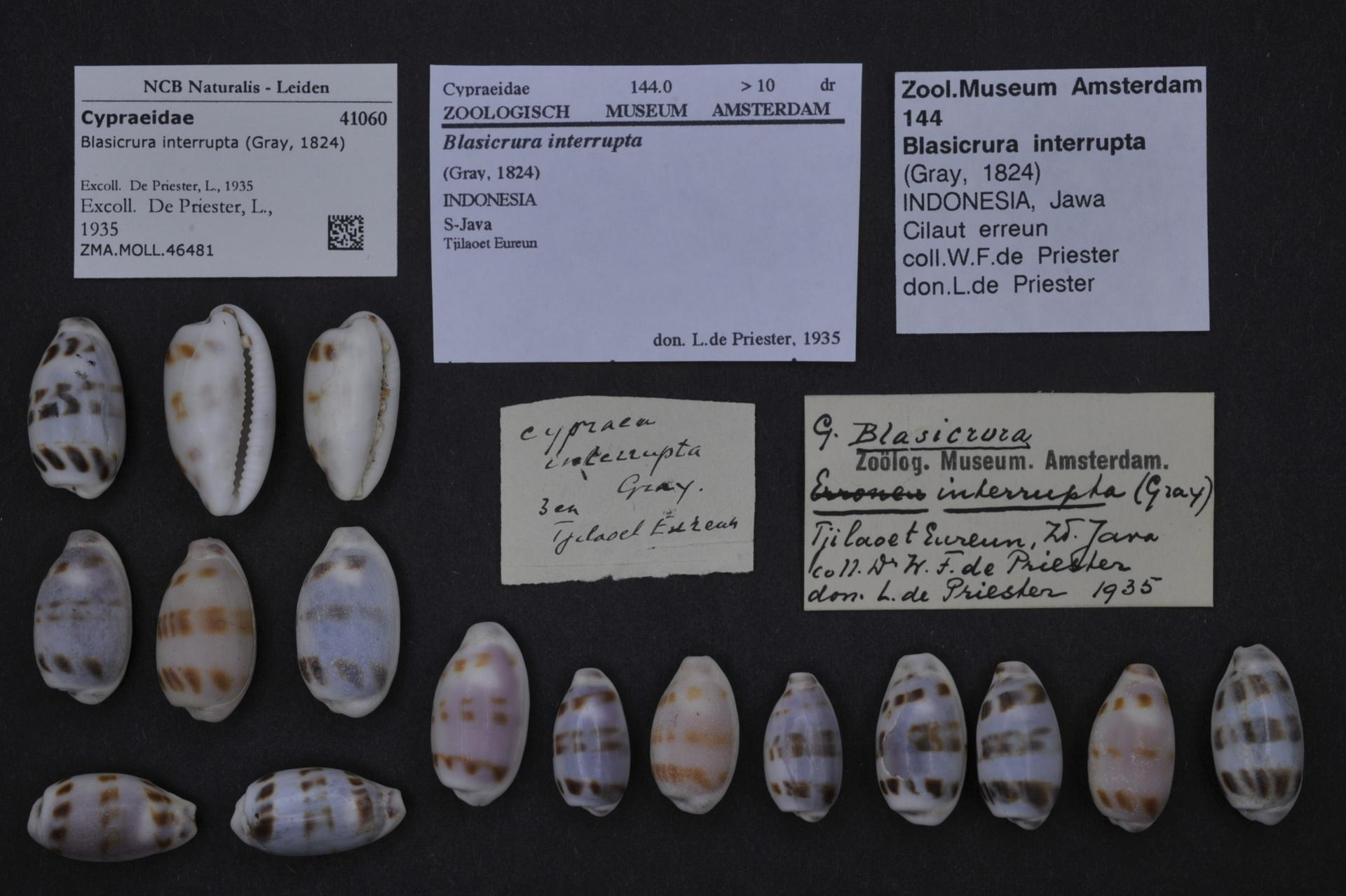
- Blasicrura interrupta (Gray, 1824)

Scientific classification
- Kingdom: Animalia
- Phylum: Mollusca
- Class: Gastropoda
- Subclass: Caenogastropoda
- Order: Littorinimorpha
- Family: Cypraeidae
- Genus: Blasicrura
- Species: B. interrupta

Binomial name
- Blasicrura interrupta (Gray, 1824)

Synonyms
- Cypraea interrupta Gray, 1824 (basionym)

= Blasicrura interrupta =

Species of gastropod

Blasicrura interrupta is a species of sea snail, a cowry, a marine gastropod mollusk in the family Cypraeidae, the cowries.
