= Blasicrura pallidula =

- Shell of Blasicrura pallidula from Philippines at the Museo Civico di Storia Naturale di Milano

Scientific classification
- Kingdom: Animalia
- Phylum: Mollusca
- Class: Gastropoda
- Subclass: Caenogastropoda
- Order: Littorinimorpha
- Family: Cypraeidae
- Genus: Blasicrura
- Species: B. pallidula

Binomial name
- Blasicrura pallidula (John Samuel Gaskoin, 1849)

Synonyms
- Cypraea pallidula (Gaskoin, 1849); Cypraea quadrimaculata var. pallidula Gaskoin, 1849

Species of gastropod

Blasicrura pallidula, common name the little pallid cowry, is a species of sea snail, a cowry, a marine gastropod mollusk in the family Cypraeidae, the cowries.

== Subspecies ==
- Blasicrura pallidula luchuana Kuroda, 1960
- Blasicrura pallidula pallidula (Gaskoin, 1849-a)
- Blasicrura pallidula rhinoceros (Souverbie, 1865)
- Blasicrura pallidula vivia Steadmand and Cotton, 1943

== Description ==
Blasicrura pallidula has a shell reaching a size of 11 – 32 mm. It is oval, the dorsum surface is usually pale brown, while the base is white. In the living cowries the mantle has a blackish coloration.

== Distribution ==
This species can be found in North Australia, Philippines, New Caledonia, Samoan Islands and rarely seen in the Maldives.
