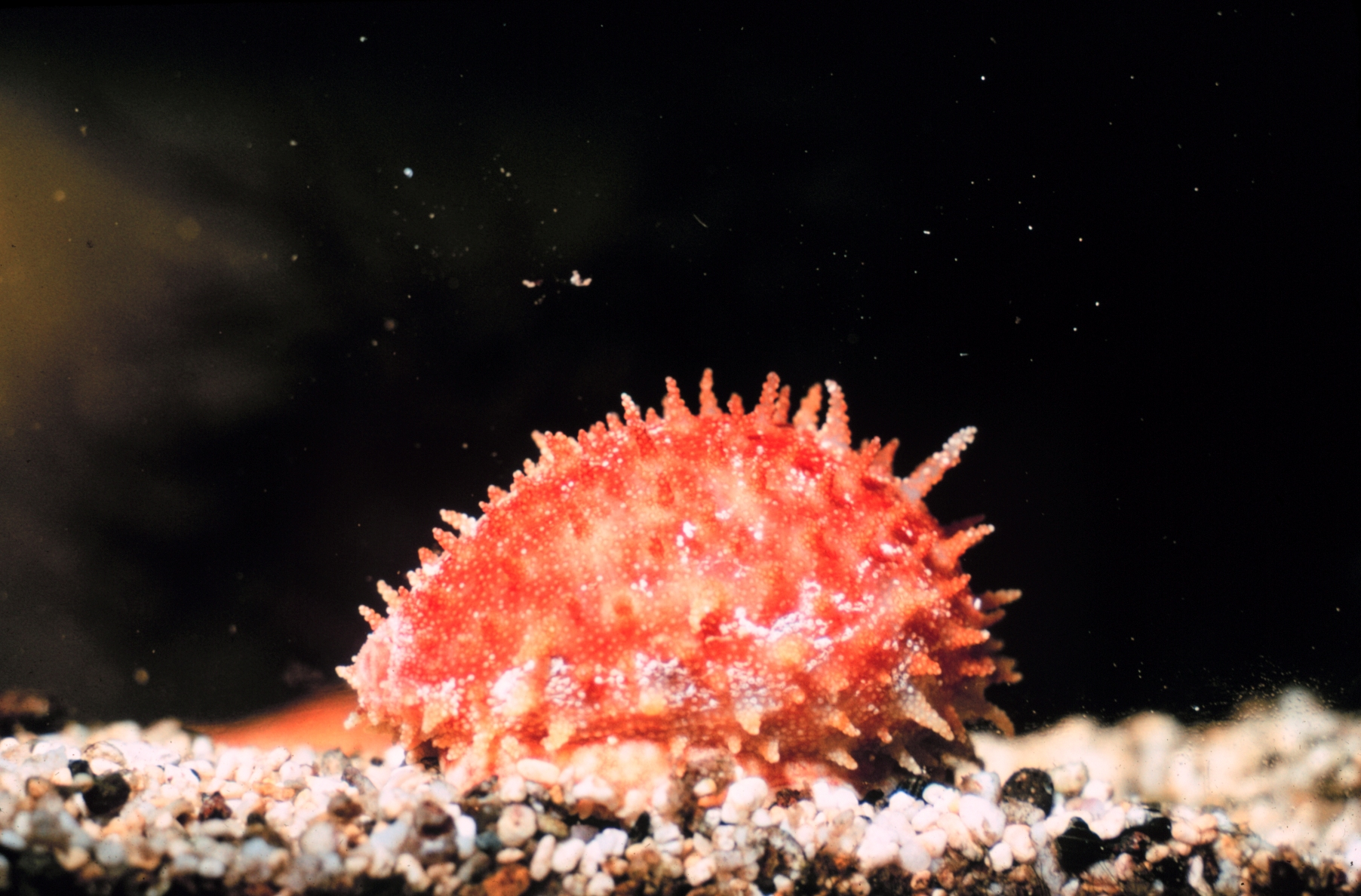
- A live Ovatipsa chinensis with its mantle fully extended
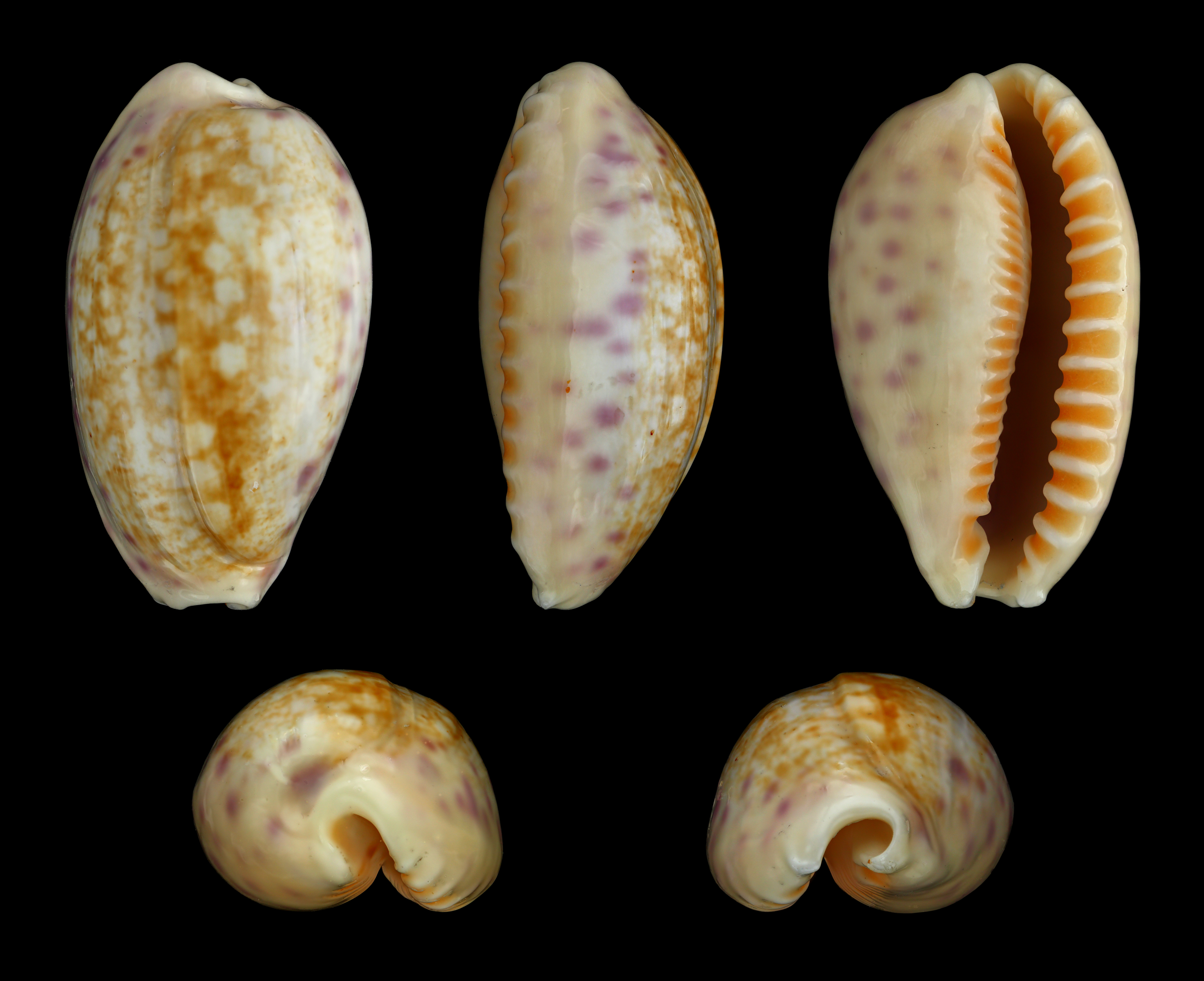
- Five views of a shell of Ovatipsa chinensis

Scientific classification
- Kingdom: Animalia
- Phylum: Mollusca
- Class: Gastropoda
- Subclass: Caenogastropoda
- Order: Littorinimorpha
- Family: Cypraeidae
- Genus: Ovatipsa
- Species: O. chinensis

Binomial name
- Ovatipsa chinensis (Gmelin, 1791)

Synonyms
- Cribraria chinensis (Gmelin, 1791); Cribraria cruenta; Cypraea chinensis Gmelin, 1791 (basionym); Cypraea cruenta; Erronea chinensis (Gmelin, 1791)

= Ovatipsa chinensis =

Species of gastropod

Ovatipsa chinensis common name the Chinese cowrie, is a species of cowry, a sea snail, a marine gastropod mollusk in the family Cypraeidae, the cowries.

== Description ==
The mantle of the animal is bright red, and it is completely covered by protruding short filaments. The shells of this species reach 25–50 millimetres (0.98–1.97 in) of length. The shells are smooth and elongate, light brown or yellowish in color with clear dots on the dorsum and a flat white base. With the subspecies variolaria (Lamarck, 1810), the basic color of the shell is light brown, with slight purple spots on the edges.

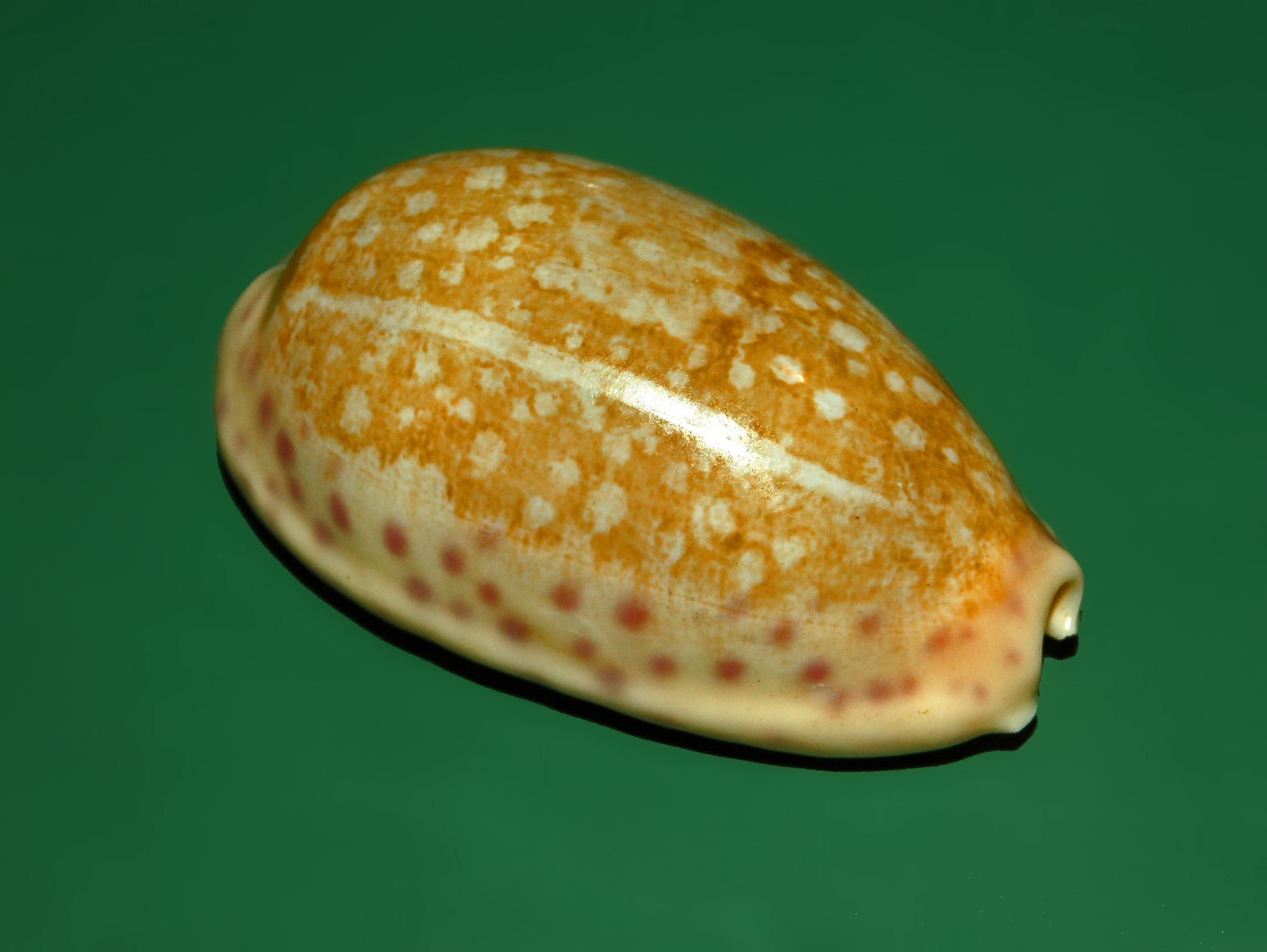
Ovatipsa chinensis variolaria, Philippines - dorsal view

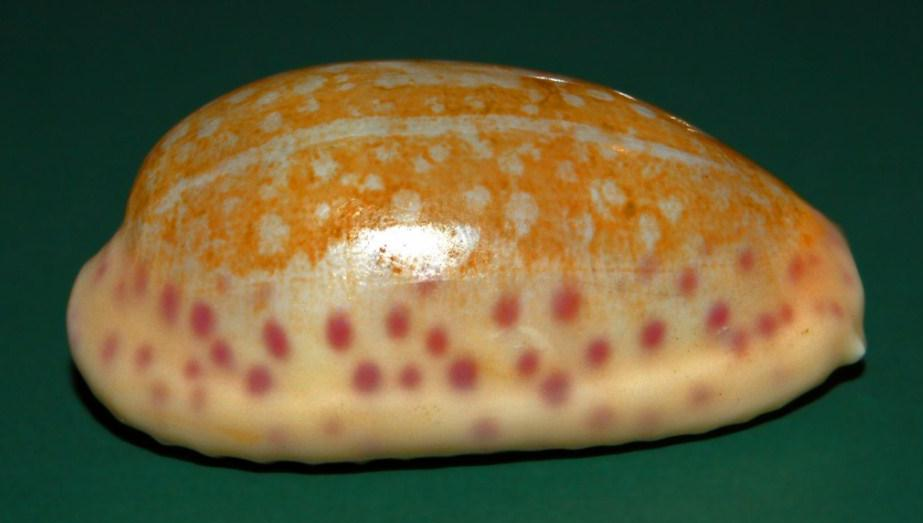
Ovatipsa chinensis variolaria, Philippines - lateral view

== Distribution and habitat ==
This species is found throughout the Indian Ocean and in the Central Pacific Ocean, in seas along Red Sea, East Africa, Australia, Indonesia and Philippines, in intertidal waters at 35–45 metres (115–148 ft) of depth . The Chinese cowry is active at night and hides under rocks in cracks and crevices during the day.

== Subspecies ==
The following subspecies have been recognized :

- Ovatipsa chinensis amiges (Melvill and Standen, 1915)
- Ovatipsa chinensis chinensis (Gmelin, 1791)
- Ovatipsa chinensis somaliana Lorenz, 1999
- Ovatipsa chinensis variolaria (Lamarck, 1810)
- Ovatipsa chinensis violacea (Rous, 1905)
