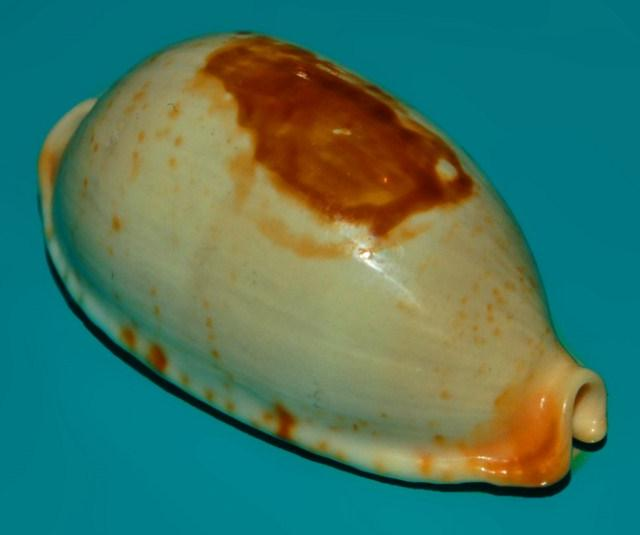
- Bistolida diauges, Kenya

Scientific classification
- Kingdom: Animalia
- Phylum: Mollusca
- Class: Gastropoda
- Subclass: Caenogastropoda
- Order: Littorinimorpha
- Family: Cypraeidae
- Genus: Bistolida
- Species: B. diauges

Binomial name
- Bistolida diauges (Melvill, 1888)

Synonyms
- Blasicrura stolida diauges (Melvill, 1888); Cypraea stolida diauges Melvill, 1888

= Bistolida diauges =

Species of gastropod

Bistolida diauges, common name: the square-spotted cowry or translucent stolida, is a species of sea snail, a marine gastropod mollusc in the family Cypraeidae, the cowries.

== Description ==
The shell reaches 23–36 millimetres (0.91–1.42 in) in length. It is elongate pyriform with rather long teeth. The basic colour is yellowish or greyish, with brown compact spot on the dorsum. The base colour is yellowish. The mantle of the animal is whitish.

== Distribution and habitat ==
This species can be found in the Red Sea and in the Western Indian Ocean, in seas along Kenya and Tanzania.

Bistolida diagues can be encountered both in shallow muddy waters with seaweeds and in deeper waters.
