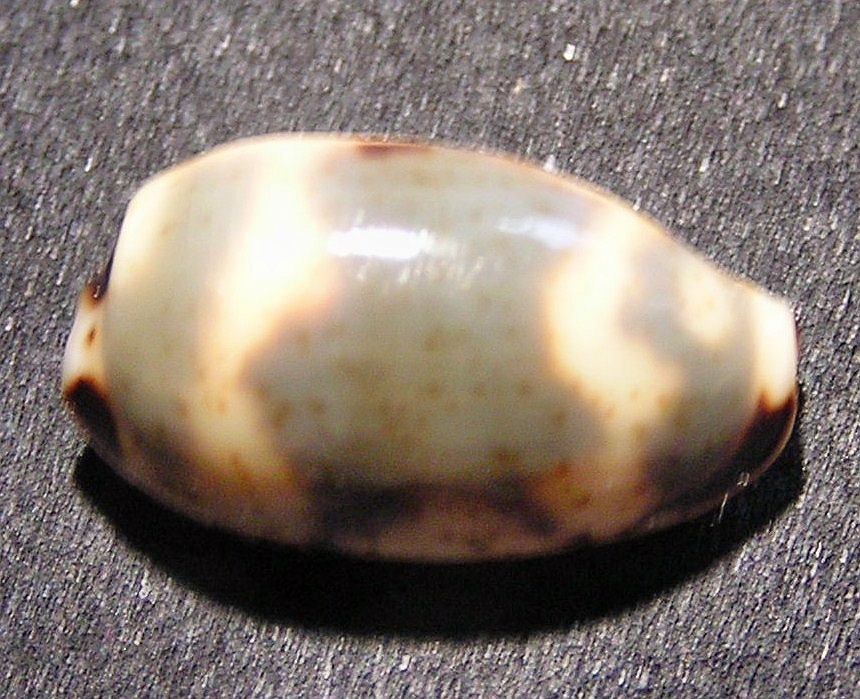
- Bistolida kieneri depriesteri

Scientific classification
- Kingdom: Animalia
- Phylum: Mollusca
- Class: Gastropoda
- Subclass: Caenogastropoda
- Order: Littorinimorpha
- Superfamily: Cypraeoidea
- Family: Cypraeidae
- Genus: Bistolida; Cossmann, 1920

Type species
- Cypraea stolida Linnaeus, 1758

Synonyms
- Derstolida Iredale, 1935; Stolida Jousseaume, 1884 (invalid: junior homonym of Stolida Lesson, 1832 [Aves]; Bistolida is a replacement name)

= Bistolida =

Genus of gastropods

Bistolida is a genus of sea snails, marine gastropod mollusks in the family Cypraeidae, the cowries.

== Species ==
Species within the genus Bistolida include:

- Bistolida brevidentata (Sowerby II, 1870)
- Bistolida diauges (Melvill, 1888)
- Bistolida erythraeensis (Sowerby I, 1837)
- Bistolida fuscomaculata (Pease, 1865)
- Bistolida goodallii (Sowerby I, 1832)
- Bistolida hirundo (Linnaeus, 1758)
- Bistolida kieneri (Hidalgo, 1906)
- Bistolida nanostraca Lorenz & Chiapponi, 2012
- Bistolida owenii (Sowerby I, 1837)
- Bistolida piae Lorenz & Chiapponi, 2005
- Bistolida stolida (Linnaeus, 1758)
- Bistolida ursellus (Gmelin, 1791)
- Bistolida vasta Schilder & Schilder, 1938

Species brought into synonymy

- Bistolida summersi Schilder, 1958: synonym of Blasicrura summersi (Schilder, 1958)
