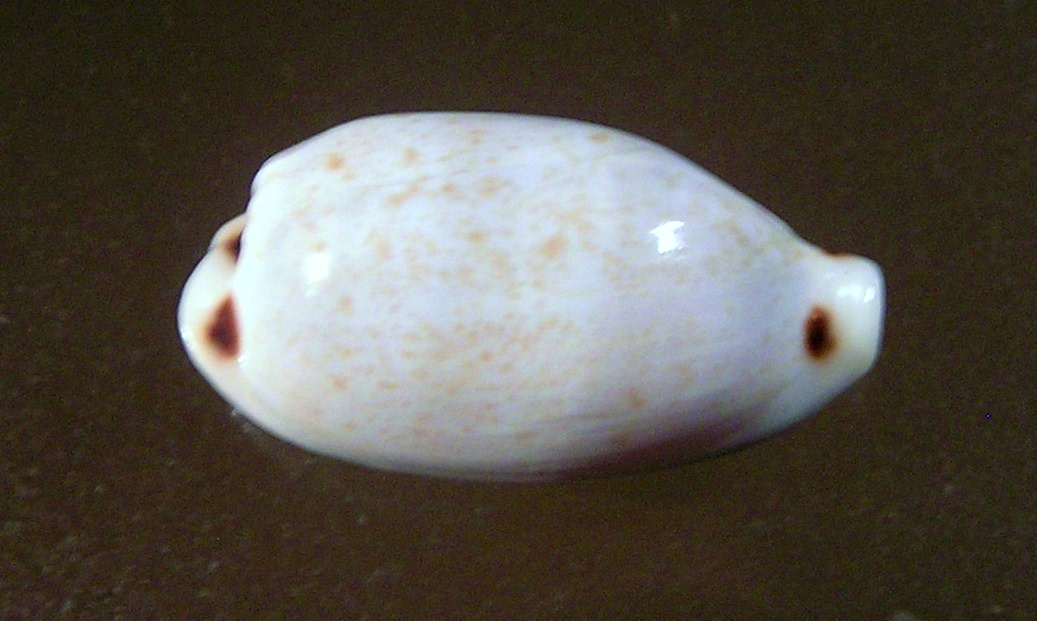
- Dorsal view of a shell of Eclogavena quadrimaculata thielei

Scientific classification
- Kingdom: Animalia
- Phylum: Mollusca
- Class: Gastropoda
- Subclass: Caenogastropoda
- Order: Littorinimorpha
- Superfamily: Cypraeoidea
- Family: Cypraeidae
- Genus: Eclogavena; Iredale, 1930

Type species
- Cypraea coxeni Cox, 1873

= Eclogavena =

Genus of gastropods

Eclogavena is a genus of sea snails, marine gastropod mollusks in the family Cypraeidae, the cowries.

== Species ==
Species within the genus Eclogavena include:

- Eclogavena coxeni (Cox, 1873)
- Eclogavena dani (Beals, 2002)
- Eclogavena dayritiana (Cate, 1963)
- Eclogavena hesperina (Schilder & Summers, 1963)
- Eclogavena luchuana (Kuroda, 1960)
- Eclogavena quadrimaculata (Gray, 1824)
- Eclogavena steineri (C. N. Cate, 1969)
