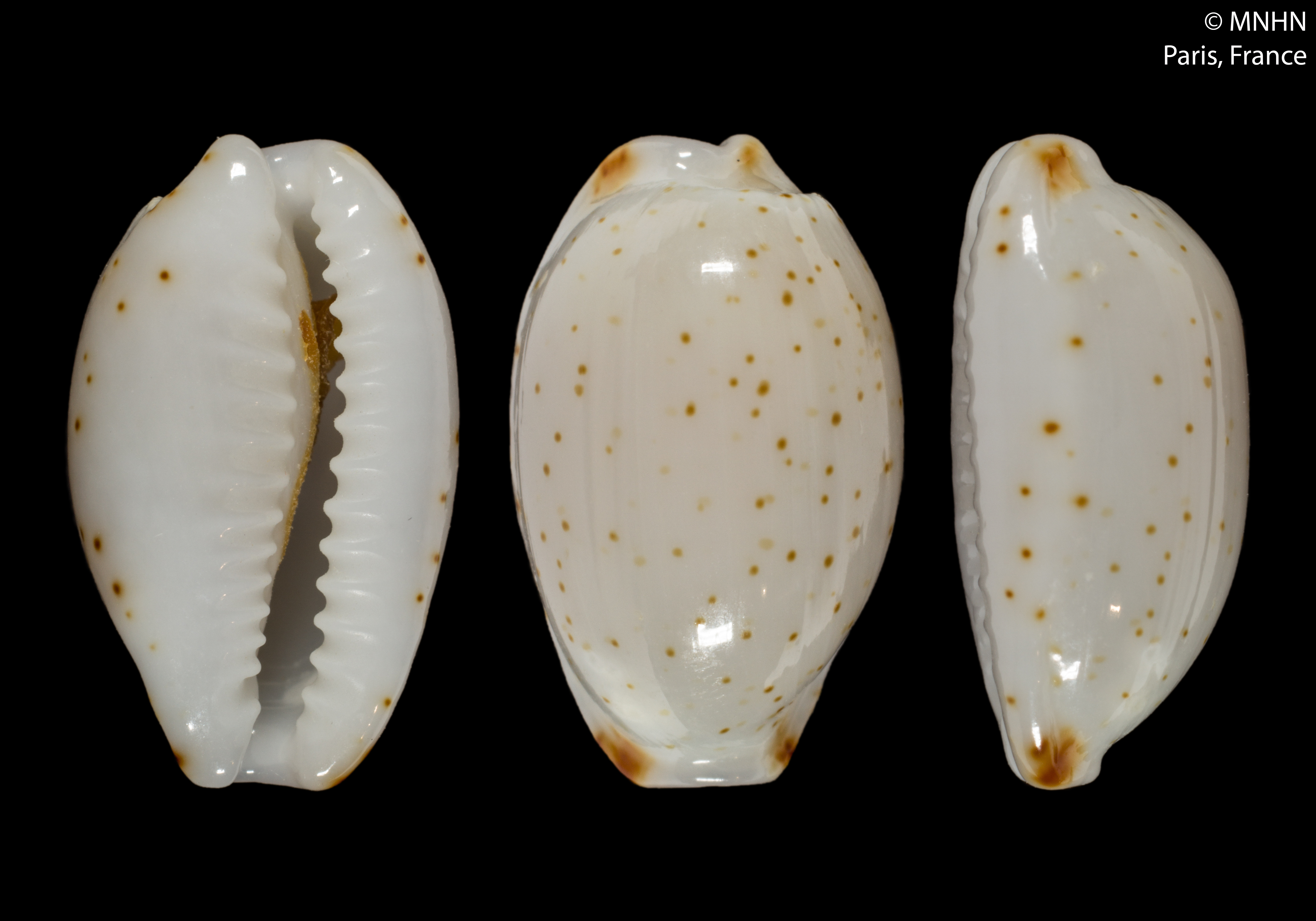
- Holotype at MNHN, Paris

Scientific classification
- Kingdom: Animalia
- Phylum: Mollusca
- Class: Gastropoda
- Subclass: Caenogastropoda
- Order: Littorinimorpha
- Family: Cypraeidae
- Genus: Bistolida
- Species: B. nanostraca

Binomial name
- Bistolida nanostraca Lorenz & Chiapponi, 2012

= Bistolida nanostraca =

Species of sea snail

Bistolida nanostraca is a species of sea snail, a marine gastropod mollusc in the family Cypraeidae, the cowries. B. nanostraca occurs in coral crevices throughout the Cargados Carajos Shoals.

It can be distinguished from its sister species B. piae, which occurs throughout the Mascarene Ridge, by way of its smaller size (9-17mm), more gracile and cylindrical shape, umbilicate spire, reduced callosity, more subtle transverse banding and ground color, finer dorsal spotting, and transparent mantle.

It has two recognized subspecies, namely B. n. nanostraca and B. n. pontifica (Chiapponi & Lorenz, 2024).
