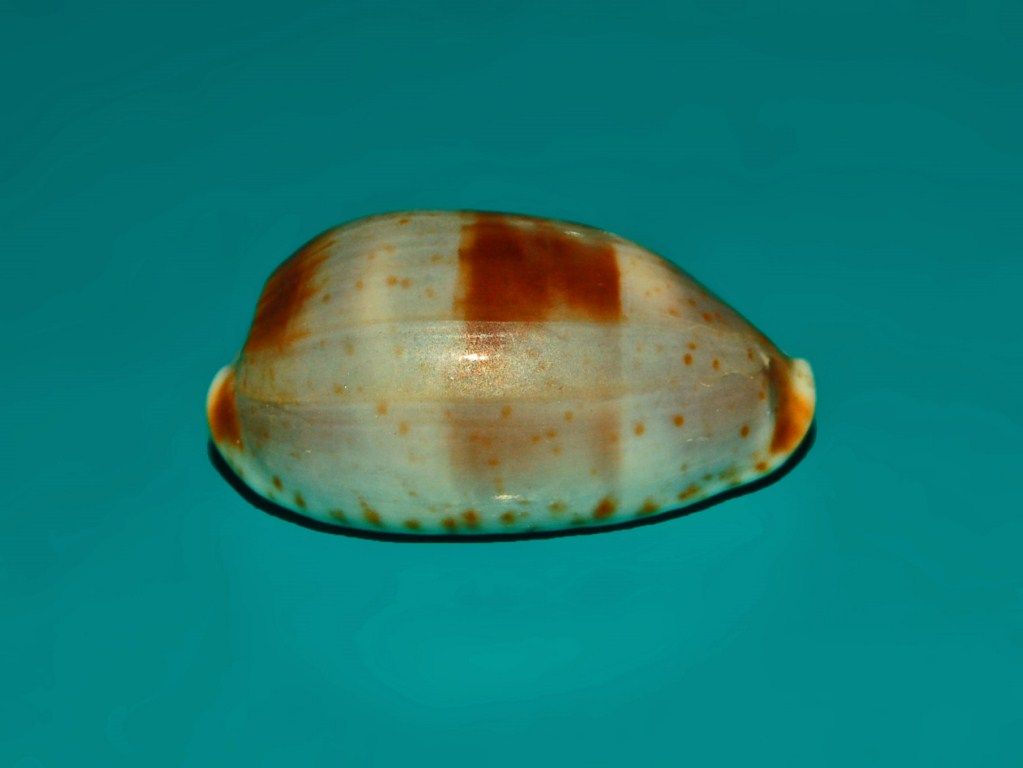
- Bistolida erythraeensis, Somalia

Scientific classification
- Kingdom: Animalia
- Phylum: Mollusca
- Class: Gastropoda
- Subclass: Caenogastropoda
- Order: Littorinimorpha
- Family: Cypraeidae
- Genus: Bistolida
- Species: B. erythraeensis

Binomial name
- Bistolida erythraeensis (Sowerby I, 1837)

Synonyms
- Cypraea erythraeensis Sowerby I, 1837 (basionym); Cypraea avalitensis Jousseaume, 1894

= Bistolida erythraeensis =

Species of gastropod

Bistolida erythraeensis, the Red Sea cowry, is a species of sea snail, a cowry, a marine gastropod mollusk in the family Cypraeidae, the cowries.

== Description ==
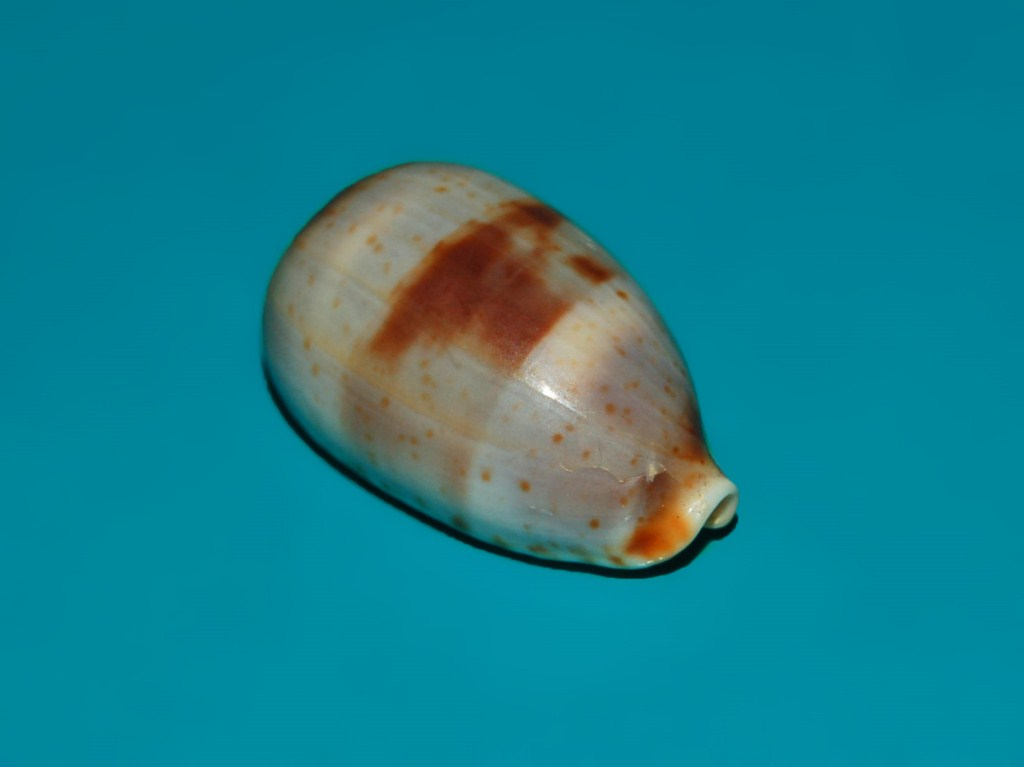
Bistolida erythraeensis, anterior end towards the right

These quite uncommon shells reach 12–22 millimetres (0.47–0.87 in) of length, with a maximum size of 32 millimetres (1.3 in). The shell surface is smooth and shiny. The dorsum is grey or pale bluish with small brown irregular blotches and spots, one or more trasversal bands and two brown spots at each end, while the base is whitish-grey with several brown spots. The shape of these shells is elongated oval, the aperture is long and narrow, outer and inner lips have fine teeth, with a tongue-shaped radula. In the living cowry the mantle and the foot are well developed, usually with external antennae. The mantle is thin, transparent and greyish-white, with many white papillae and covers almost entirely the shell.

== Distribution ==
This species can be found in the Red Sea, and the seas along Aden, Eritrea, Somalia, Tanzania and Zanzibar.

== Habitat ==
These cowries live in warm tropical and subtropical waters, from intertidal zone to the shallow reef, at about 5–25 metres (16–82 ft) of depth, mainly on coral reefs, in caves, under rock slabs or on sandy seabed. They fear daylight and feed at dawn or dusk on algae, sponges, coral polyps and small crustaceans.
