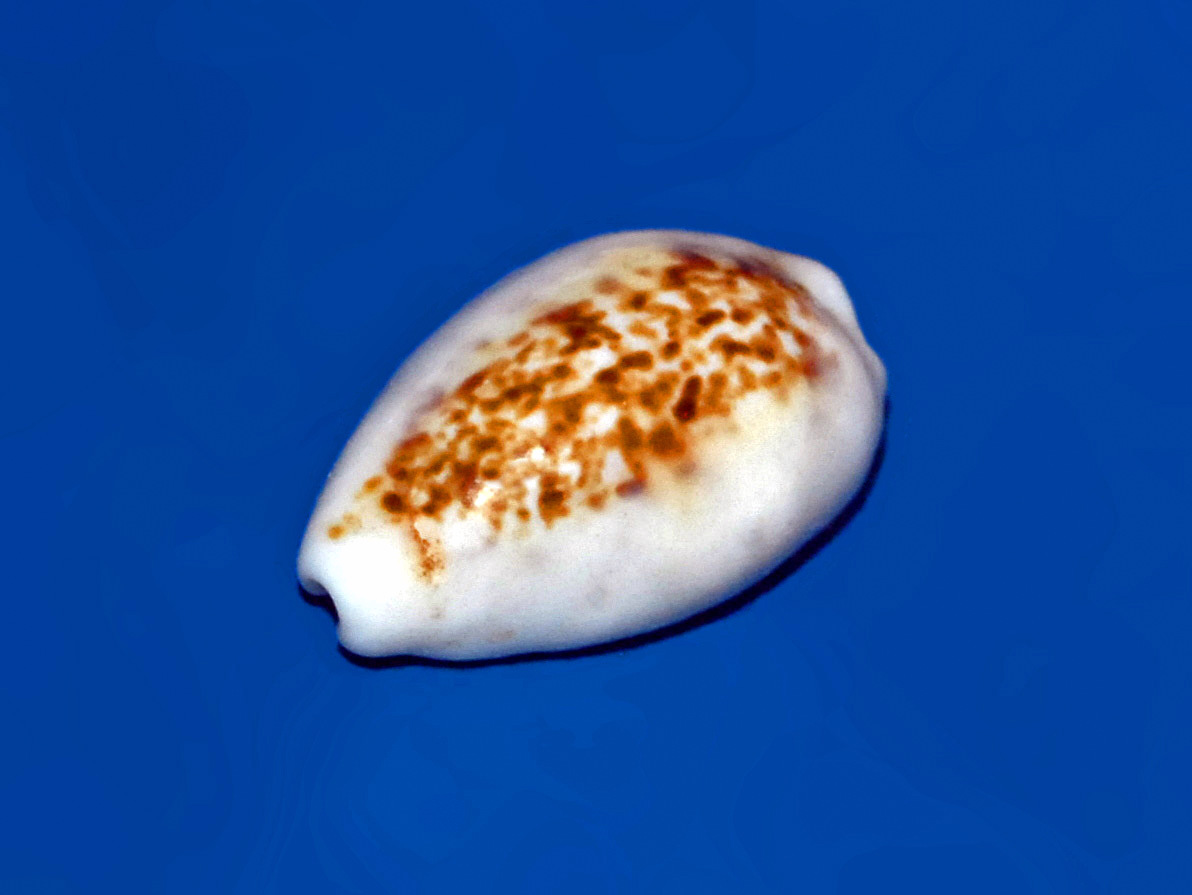
- Shell of Eclogavena coxeni from Solomon Islands at the Museo Civico di Storia Naturale di Milano

Scientific classification
- Kingdom: Animalia
- Phylum: Mollusca
- Class: Gastropoda
- Subclass: Caenogastropoda
- Order: Littorinimorpha
- Family: Cypraeidae
- Genus: Eclogavena
- Species: E. coxeni

Binomial name
- Eclogavena coxeni (Cox, 1873)

Synonyms
- Blasicrura coxeni (Cox, 1873); Cypraea coxeni Cox, 1873

= Eclogavena coxeni =

Species of gastropod

Eclogavena coxeni, common name Cox's cowrie, is a species of sea snail, a cowry, a marine gastropod mollusc in the family Cypraeidae, the cowries.

== Description ==
Eclogavena coxeni has a shell reaching a length of 14–32 mm.

== Distribution ==
This species can be found in New Guinea, Solomon Islands.
