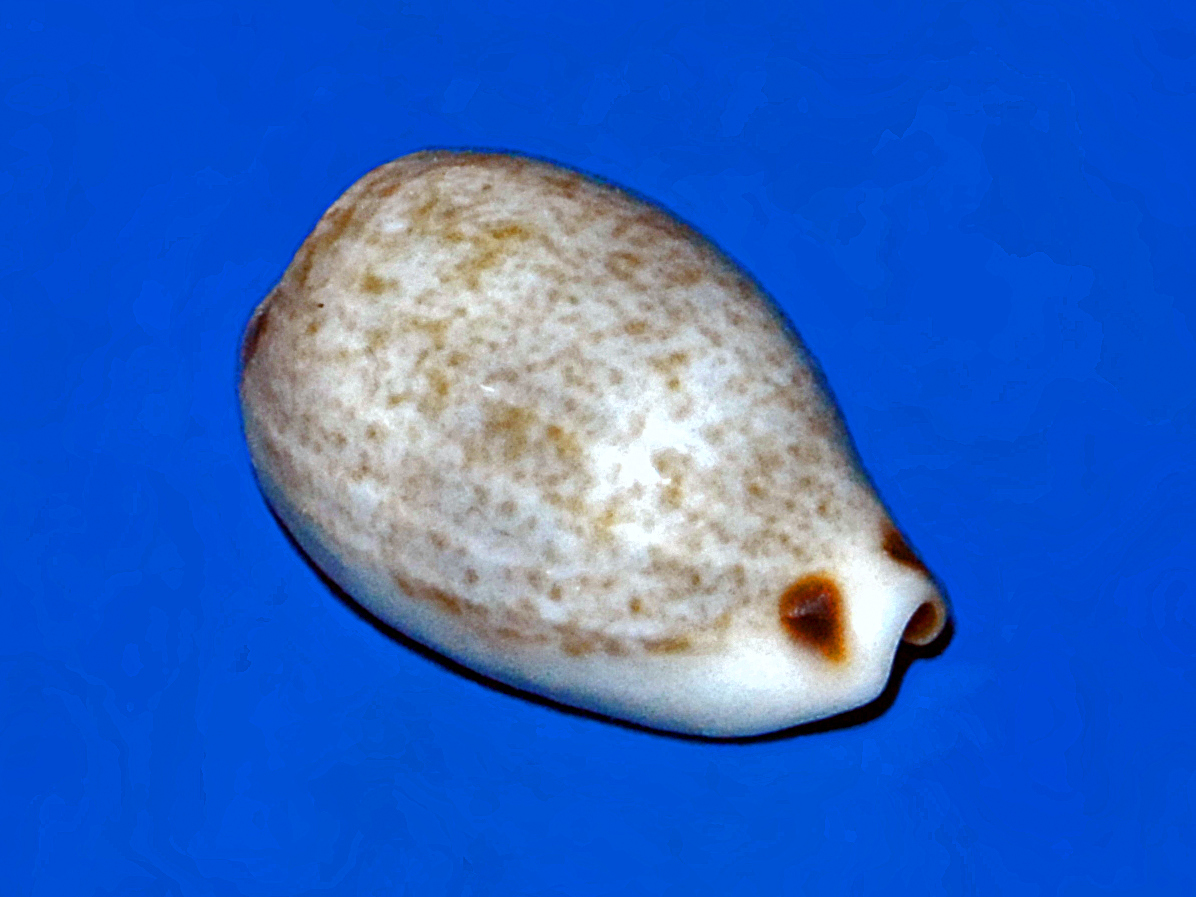
- A shell of Eclogavena quadrimaculata from Australia

Scientific classification
- Kingdom: Animalia
- Phylum: Mollusca
- Class: Gastropoda
- Subclass: Caenogastropoda
- Order: Littorinimorpha
- Family: Cypraeidae
- Genus: Eclogavena
- Species: E. quadrimaculata

Binomial name
- Eclogavena quadrimaculata (J. E. Gray, 1824)

Synonyms
- Blasicrura quadrimaculata (Gray, 1824); Blasicrura (Blasicrura) quadrimaculata garretti Schilder, F.A. & Schilder, M. 1939; Cypraea nimbosa Dillwyn 1827; Cypraea quadrimaculata Gray, 1824; Eclogavena quadrimaculata quadrimaculata (Gray, 1824) · accepted, alternate representation

= Eclogavena quadrimaculata =

Species of gastropod

Eclogavena quadrimaculata, the four-spotted cowry, is a species of sea snail, a cowry, a marine gastropod mollusc in the family Cypraeidae, the cowries.

== Subspecies ==
- Eclogavena quadrimaculata quadrimaculata (Gray, 1824)
- Eclogavena quadrimaculata thielei Schilder & Schilder, 1938

== Description ==
Shells of Eclogavena quadrimaculata can reach a size of 14–36 millimetres (0.55–1.42 in). The surface of these cylindrical shells may be whitish, pale grey or pale blue, with many small brown flecks and with two large rather triangular dark brown spots at each end (hence the common name and the Latin species name quadrimaculata). These shells are completely white or pale yellowish underneath. Teeth are raised, not coloured and spread right across base up to the margin. The living animal shows a dark brown or black mantle with small white or pinkish spots.

== Distribution ==
This species is present in Australia (Northern Territory, Queensland) and Philippines. These cowries can be found under rocks and among coral rubble.

== Gallery ==
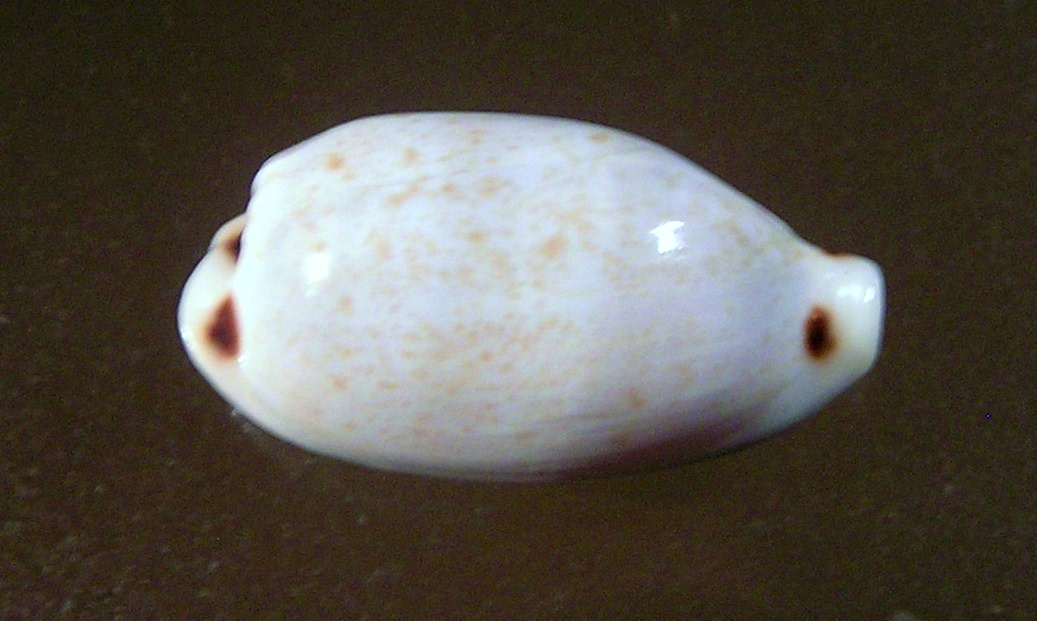
Dorsal view of a shell of Eclogavena quadrimaculata thielei

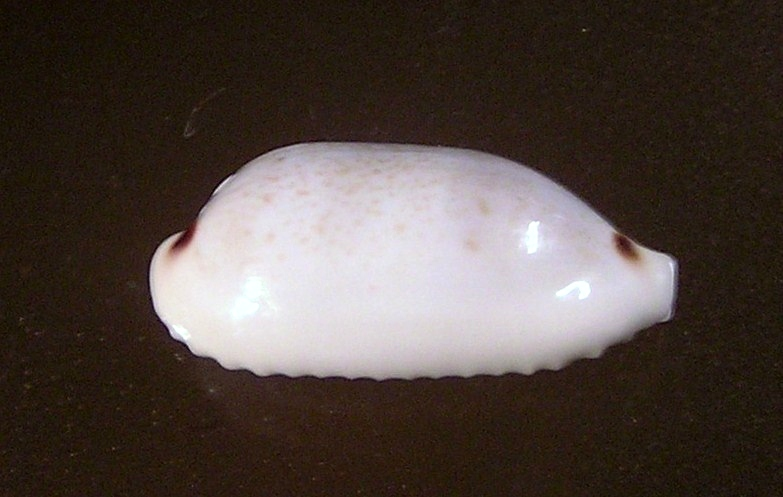
Lateral view

== Bibliography ==
- A. Robin - Encyclopedia of Marine Gastropods, p 95/9
- Felix Lorenz and A. Hubert - Guide to Worldwide Cowries, p 367/25-27, 31-33
- Philippine Marine Molluscs, Vol. 1, p 102; Pl. 140/2, 4, 6
- Robertson, R. (1981). List of shell-bearing mollusks observed and collected at Lizard Island, Great Barrier Reef, Australia, Tryonia, 4: 1-32. LIRS catalog number 403
- Tan Siong Kiat and Henrietta P. M. Woo, 2010 Preliminary Checklist of The Molluscs of Singapore (pdf), Raffles Museum of Biodiversity Research, National University of Singapore
- Wilson, B. (1993). Australian Marine Shells: 1. Prosobranch gastropods. Odyssey Publishing, Kallaroo, Western Australia.
- Liu J.Y. [Ruiyu] (ed.). (2008). Checklist of marine biota of China seas. China Science Press. 1267 pp.
