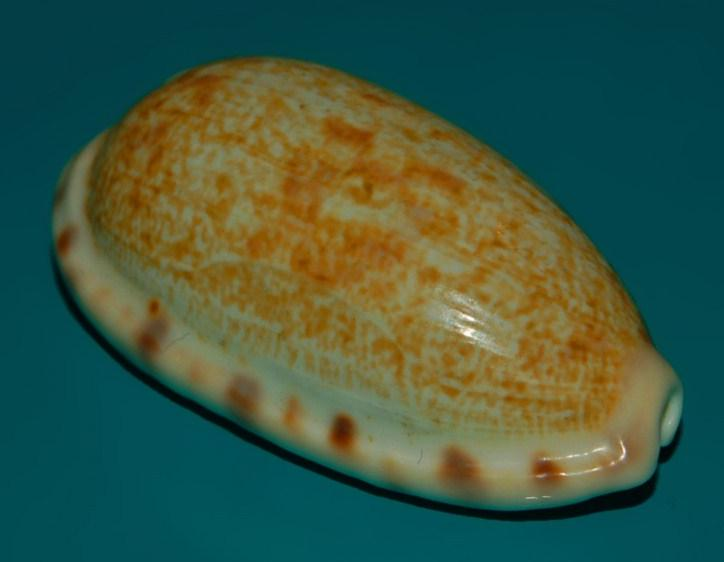

Scientific classification
- Kingdom: Animalia
- Phylum: Mollusca
- Class: Gastropoda
- Subclass: Caenogastropoda
- Order: Littorinimorpha
- Family: Cypraeidae
- Genus: Talostolida
- Species: T. pellucens

Binomial name
- Talostolida pellucens (Melvill, 1888)

Synonyms
- Blasicrura alisonae Burgess, 1983; Blasicrura pellucens (Melvill, 1888); Blasicrura teres natalensis Heiman & Mienis, 2002 ·; Cypraea alisonae Burgess, 1983; Cypraea tabescens var. pellucens Melvill, 1888 (basionym); Cypraea teres pellucens Melvill, 1888

= Talostolida pellucens =

Species of gastropod

Talostolida pellucens is a species of sea snail, a cowry, a marine gastropod mollusc in the family Cypraeidae, the cowries.

There are two subspecies:

- Talostolida pellucens panamensis (Lorenz, 2002)
- Talostolida pellucens pellucens (Melvill, 1888)

Synonyms

- Talostolida pellucens jacksoni Daughenbaugh & Beals, 2013: synonym of Talostolida pellucens pellucens (Melvill, 1888)
- Talostolida pellucens sumeihoae Daughenbaugh & Beals, 2013: synonym of Talostolida pellucens panamensis (Lorenz, 2002)

== Distribution ==
This species can be found in the Mascarene Basin
