= Bistolida owenii =

Scientific classification
- Kingdom: Animalia
- Phylum: Mollusca
- Class: Gastropoda
- Subclass: Caenogastropoda
- Order: Littorinimorpha
- Family: Cypraeidae
- Genus: Bistolida
- Species: B. owenii

Binomial name
- Bistolida owenii (Sowerby II, 1837)

Synonyms
- Blasicrura owenii (Sowerby II, 1837); Cypraea oweni [sic] (misspelling); Cypraea owenii Sowerby II, 1837

Species of gastropod

Bistolida owenii is a species of sea snail, a cowry, a marine gastropod mollusc in the family Cypraeidae, the cowries.

== Subspecies ==
- Bistolida owenii owenii (Sowerby II, 1837)
  - forma : Bistolida owenii owenii modesta (f) (Sowerby III, 1870)
- Bistolida owenii menkeana (Deshayes, 1863) -- uncertain status

== Distribution ==
This species is found in the seas around the Comoros, Kenya, Madagascar, the Mascarene Basin, Mauritius; Reunion, the Seychelles, Tanzania and Transkei.
