= Eclogavena dani =

Scientific classification
- Kingdom: Animalia
- Phylum: Mollusca
- Class: Gastropoda
- Subclass: Caenogastropoda
- Order: Littorinimorpha
- Family: Cypraeidae
- Genus: Eclogavena
- Species: E. dani

Binomial name
- Eclogavena dani (Beals, 2002à)

Synonyms
- Blasicrura dani Beals, 2002

Species of mollusc

Eclogavena dani is a species of sea snail, a cowry, a marine gastropod mollusc in the family Cypraeidae, the cowries.
