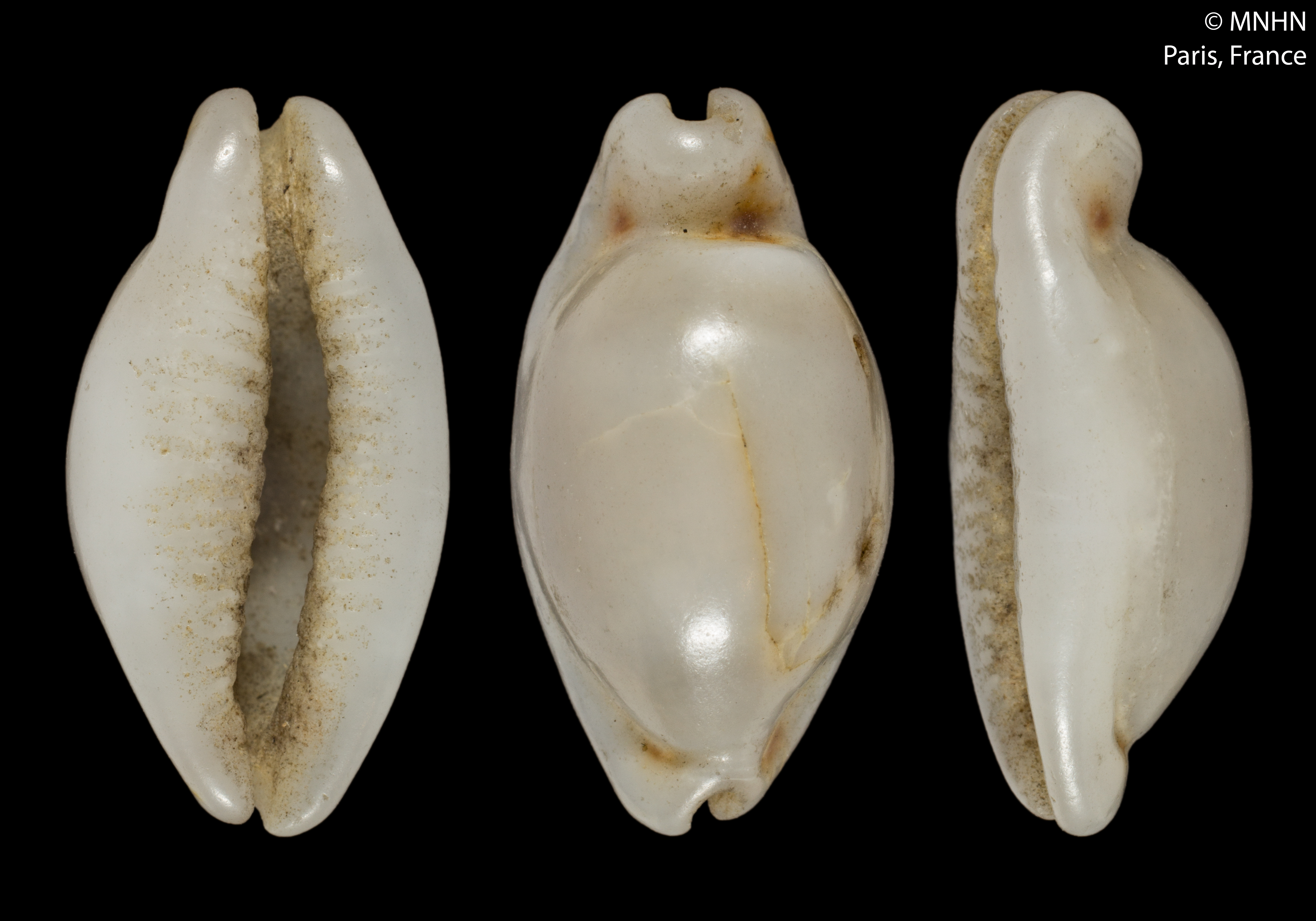
- Shell of Bistolida hirundo (syntype at MNHN, Paris)

Scientific classification
- Kingdom: Animalia
- Phylum: Mollusca
- Class: Gastropoda
- Subclass: Caenogastropoda
- Order: Littorinimorpha
- Family: Cypraeidae
- Genus: Bistolida
- Species: B. hirundo

Binomial name
- Bistolida hirundo (Linnaeus, 1758)

Synonyms
- Bistolida hirundo hirundo (Linnaeus, 1758)· accepted, alternate representation; Blasicrura hirundo (Linnaeus, 1758); Cypraea hirundo Linnaeus, 1758; Cypraea hirundo var. formosa Gray, 1824; Cypraea parvula Philippi, 1849 (junior synonym); Evenaria hirundo (Linnaeus, 1758); Evenaria hirundo cameroni Iredale, 1939

= Bistolida hirundo =

Species of gastropod

Bistolida hirundo is a species of sea snail, a cowry, a marine gastropod mollusc in the family Cypraeidae, the cowries.

== Subspecies ==
- Bistolida hirundo francisca (Schilder & Schilder, 1938)
- Bistolida hirundo neglecta (Sowerby I, 1837) (species inquirenda)
- Bistolida hirundo rouxi (Ancey, 1882) (species inquirenda)

== Distribution ==
This species occurs in the Red Sea and in the Indian Ocean off Aldabra, Chagos, Kenya, Madagascar, Mauritius, Réunion, the Seychelles, Somalia and Tanzania.
