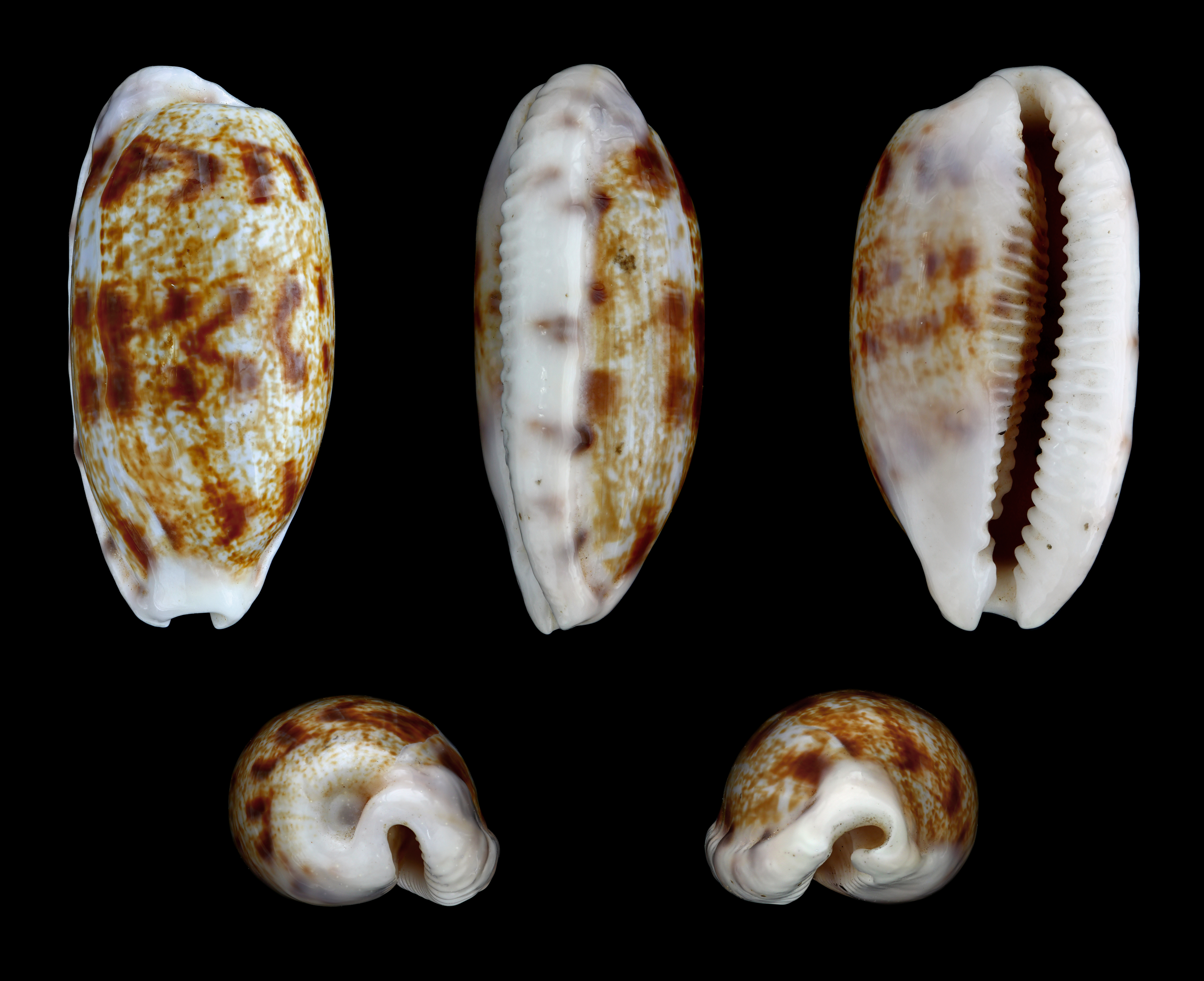
- Five views of a shell of Talostolida teres

Scientific classification
- Kingdom: Animalia
- Phylum: Mollusca
- Class: Gastropoda
- Subclass: Caenogastropoda
- Order: Littorinimorpha
- Family: Cypraeidae
- Genus: Talostolida
- Species: T. teres

Binomial name
- Talostolida teres (Gmelin, 1791)

Synonyms
- Blasicrura teres (Gmelin, 1791); Cribraria teres (Gmelin, 1791); Cypraea faedata Sulliotti, 1911; Cypraea subfasciata Link, 1807; Cypraea tabescens Dillwyn, 1817; Cypraea tabescens var. alveolus Tapparone-Canefri, 1882; Cypraea tabescens var. elaoides Melvill, 1888; Cypraea teres Gmelin, 1791

= Talostolida teres =

- A live individual of Talostolida teres

Species of gastropod

Talostolida teres, common name the tapering cowry, is a species of sea snail, a cowry, a marine gastropod mollusc in the family Cypraeidae, the cowries.

== Subspecies ==
Recognized subspecies within this species are:

- Talostolida teres alveolus (Tapparone-Canefri, 1882) (synonyms: Blasicrura teres alveolus (Tapparone-Canefri, 1882); Cribraria teres alveolus Tapparone-Canefri, 1882; Cypraea teres alveolus Tapperone-Canefri) (taxon inquirendum)
- Talostolida teres elatensis (Heiman & Mienis, 2002) (synonym: Blasicrura teres elatensis Heiman & Mienis, 2002)
- Talostolida teres janae (Lorenz, 2002) (synonym: * Blasicrura teres janae Lorenz, 2002)
- Talostolida teres teres (Gmelin, 1791) (synonyms: Blasicrura teres teres (Gmelin, 1791); Cypraea teres teres Gmelin, 1791)

Synonyms

- Talostolida teres natalensis (Heiman & Mienis, 2002): synonym of Talostolida pellucens pellucens (Melvill, 1888) (synonym: Blasicrura teres natalensis Heiman & Mienis, 2002)

== Description ==
The shells of these quite common cowries reach on average 25–32 millimetres (0.98–1.26 in) of length, with a minimum size of 8 millimetres (0.31 in) and a maximum size of 44 millimetres (1.7 in). They are very variable in pattern and colour. The shape may be cylindrical or sub-cylindrical. The dorsum surface is smooth and shiny, the basic color is whitish, greenish or pale brown, with irregular dark brown patches, sometimes forming two-three transversal bands. The surface may also be completely grey-greenish. The margins are white or pale brown, with some dark dots and a pronounced labial 'callus'. The base is white or pinkish with fine short teeth. In the living cowries mantle is orange-reddish, with white sensorial papillae. Mantle and foot are well developed, with external antennae.

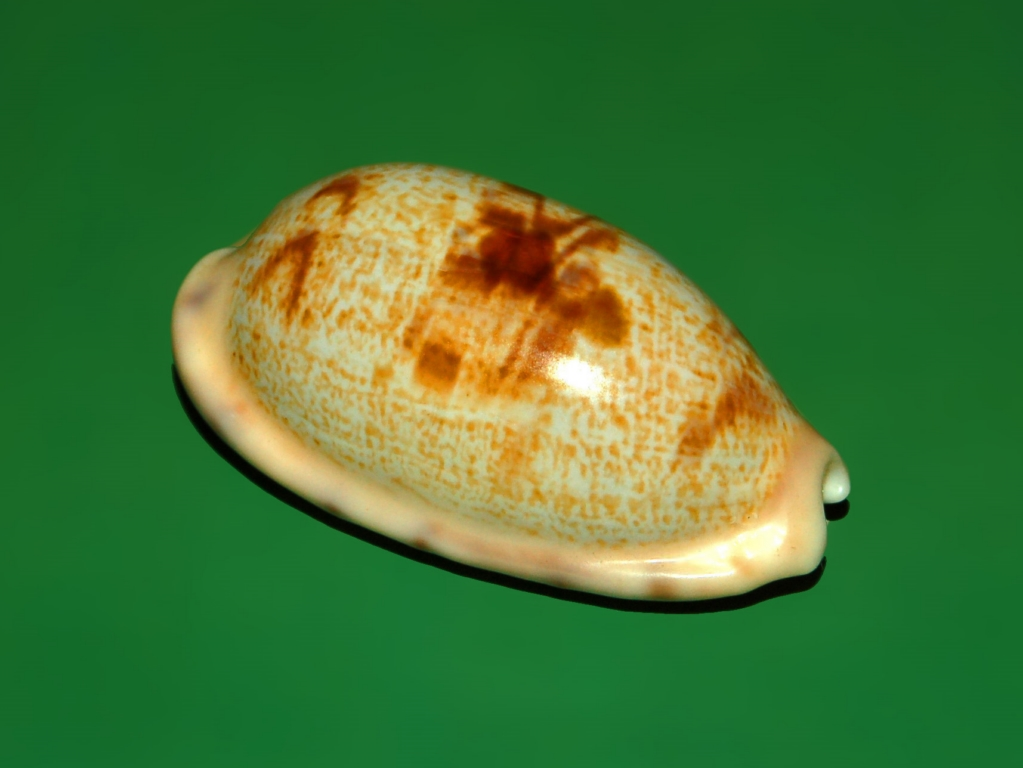
A shell of Talostolida teres, dorsal view, anterior end towards the right

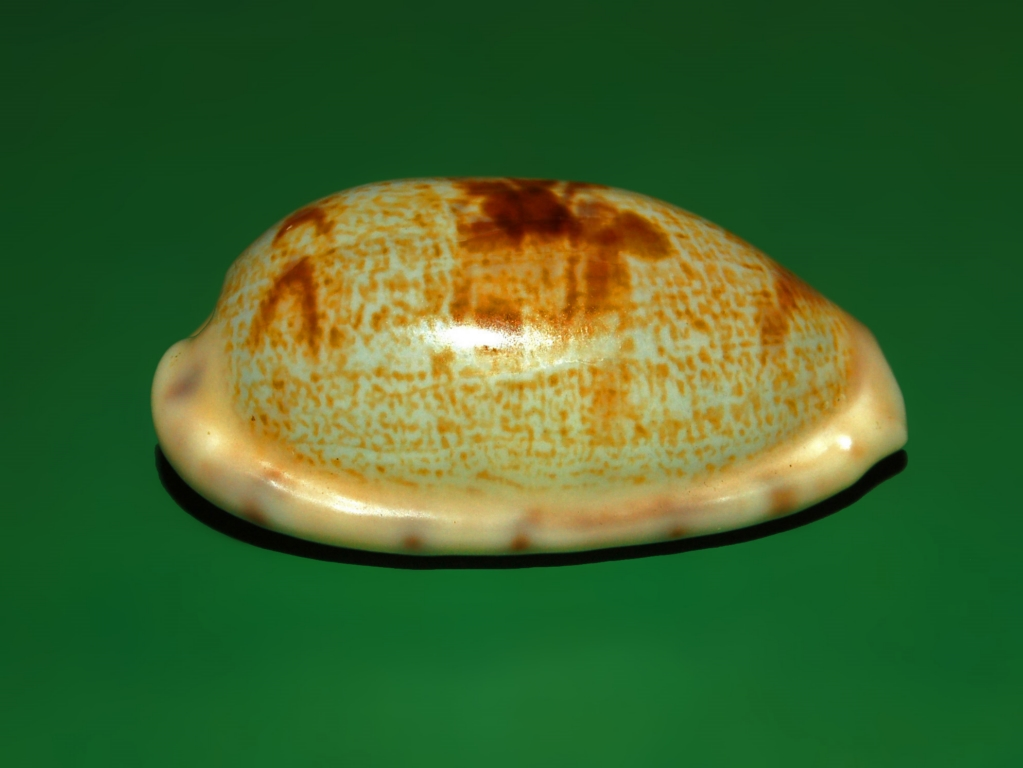
A shell of Talostolida teres, lateral view, anterior end towards the right

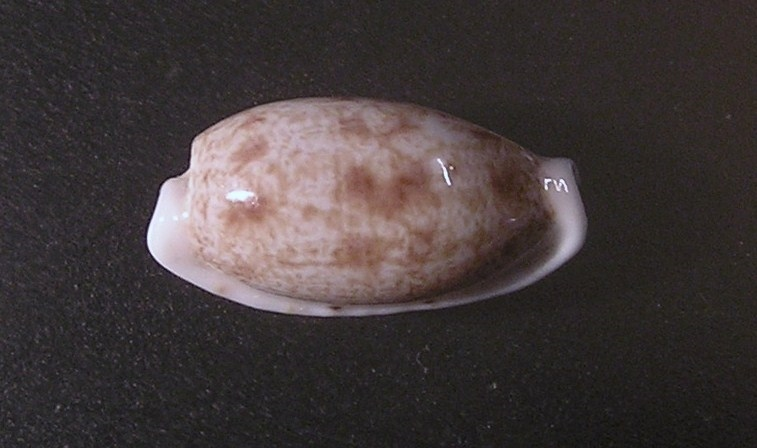
A shell of Talostolida teres, dorsal view, anterior end towards the right

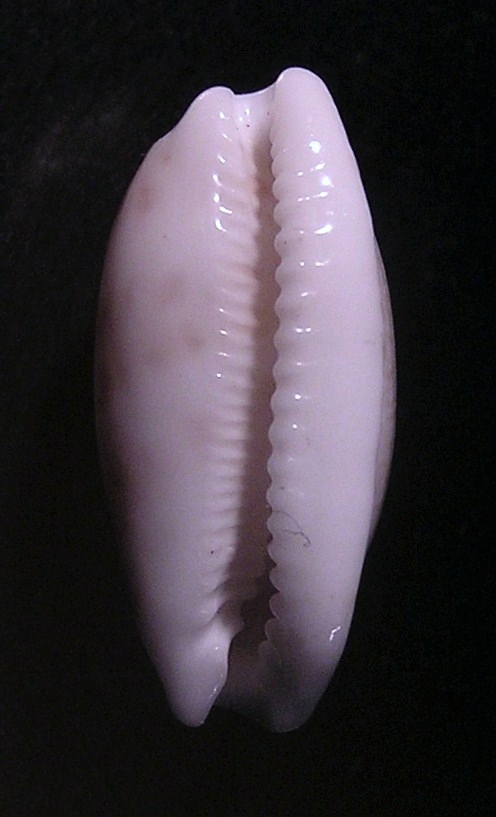
Apertural view

== Distribution ==
This species and the subspecies occur widely in the Red Sea, in the Indian Ocean off East Africa and South Africa (Aldabra, Chagos, the Comores, Kenya, Madagascar, the Mascarene Basin, Mauritius, Mozambique, Réunion, the Seychelles, Somalia and Tanzania) and in Western and Eastern Pacific Ocean along Western Australia, Philippines, Bali, East Timor, Solomon Islands, Papua New Guinea, Vanuatu, Tahiti, New Caledonia, Fiji, Taiwan and Hawaii. The subspecies Blasicrura teres pellucens (Melvill, 1888) reach Galapagos and Panama.

== Habitat ==
These cowries live on rocks or under corals in the intertidal zone.
