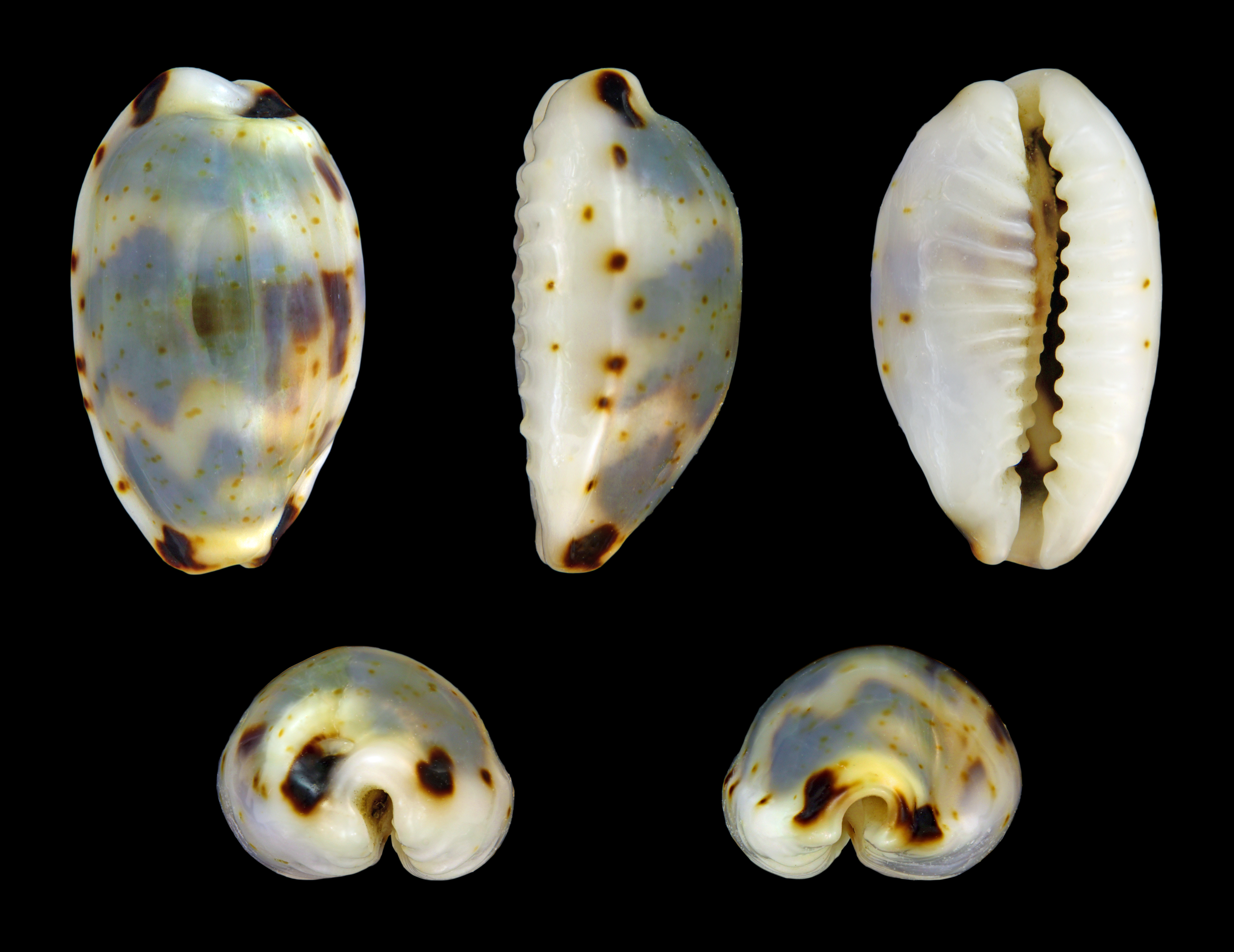
- Bistolida kieneri depriesteri from the Philippines

Scientific classification
- Kingdom: Animalia
- Phylum: Mollusca
- Class: Gastropoda
- Subclass: Caenogastropoda
- Order: Littorinimorpha
- Family: Cypraeidae
- Genus: Bistolida
- Species: B. kieneri

Binomial name
- Bistolida kieneri (Hidalgo, 1906)

Synonyms
- Blasicrura kieneri (Hidalgo, 1906); Cypraea kieneri Hidalgo, 1906

= Bistolida kieneri =

Species of gastropod

Bistolida kieneri, common name: Kiener's cowry, is a species of sea snail, a cowry, a marine gastropod mollusc in the family Cypraeidae, the cowries.

== Subspecies ==
The following subspecies are recognized:

- Bistolida kieneri depriesteri Schilder, 1933
- Bistolida kieneri kieneri (Hidalgo, 1906) (synonym : Erronea reductesignata Schilder, 1924)
- Bistolida kieneri schneideri Schilder & Schilder, 1938

== Description ==
The shells of these common cowries reach on average 12–15 millimetres (0.47–0.59 in) of length, with a minimum size of 8 millimetres (0.31 in) and a maximum size of 24 millimetres (0.94 in). The basic color of these oval-shaped smooth and shiny shells is whitish, with irregular greenish or blueish blotches or trasversal bands and brown small brown spots on the edges of both sides. Also the extremities show two larger brown blotches. The base is mainly whitish, with a narrow sinuous aperture with several short teeth. In the living cowries the mantle is very thin and transparent, with short papillae and external antennae.

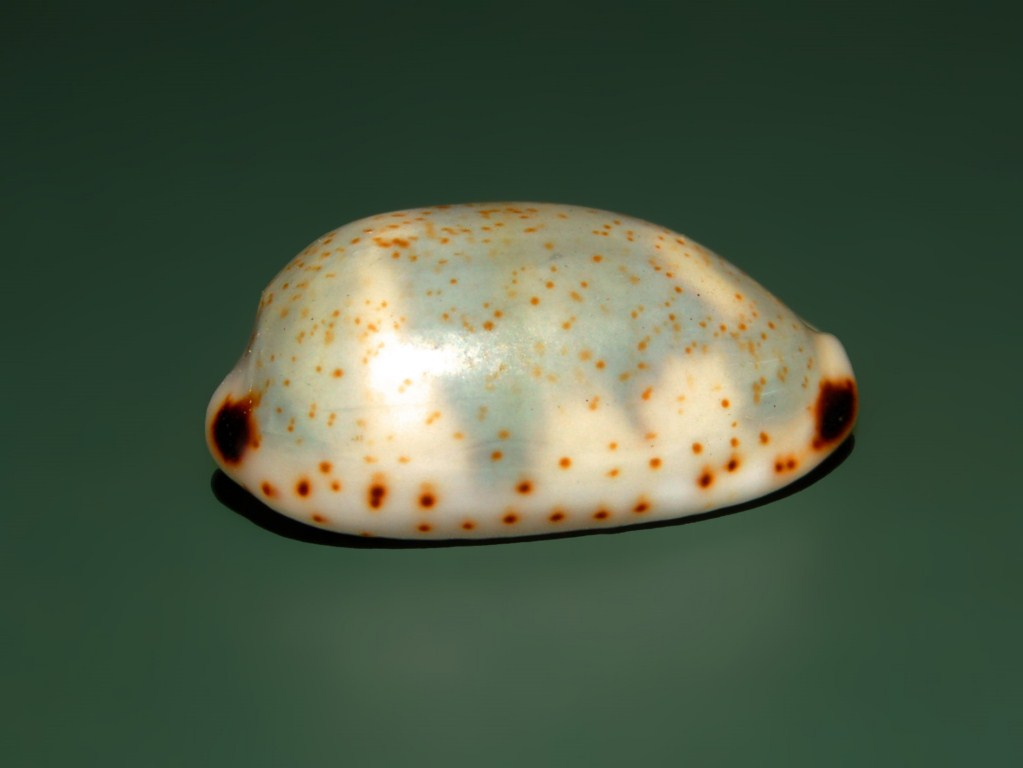
A shell of Bistolida kiener from India, lateral view, anterior end towards the right

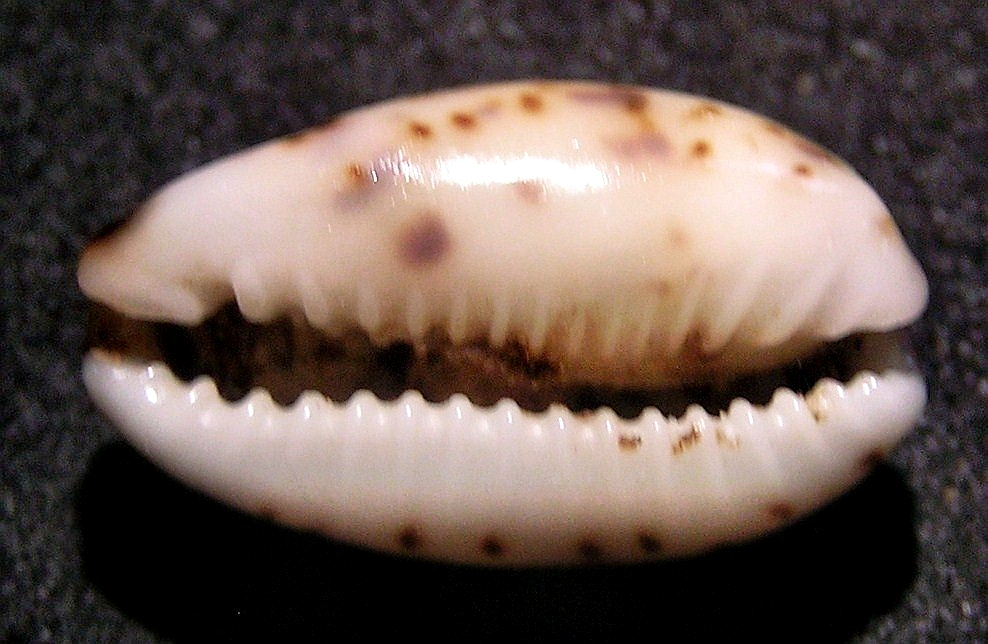
A shell of Bistolida kieneri depriesteri, apertural view, anterior end towards the left

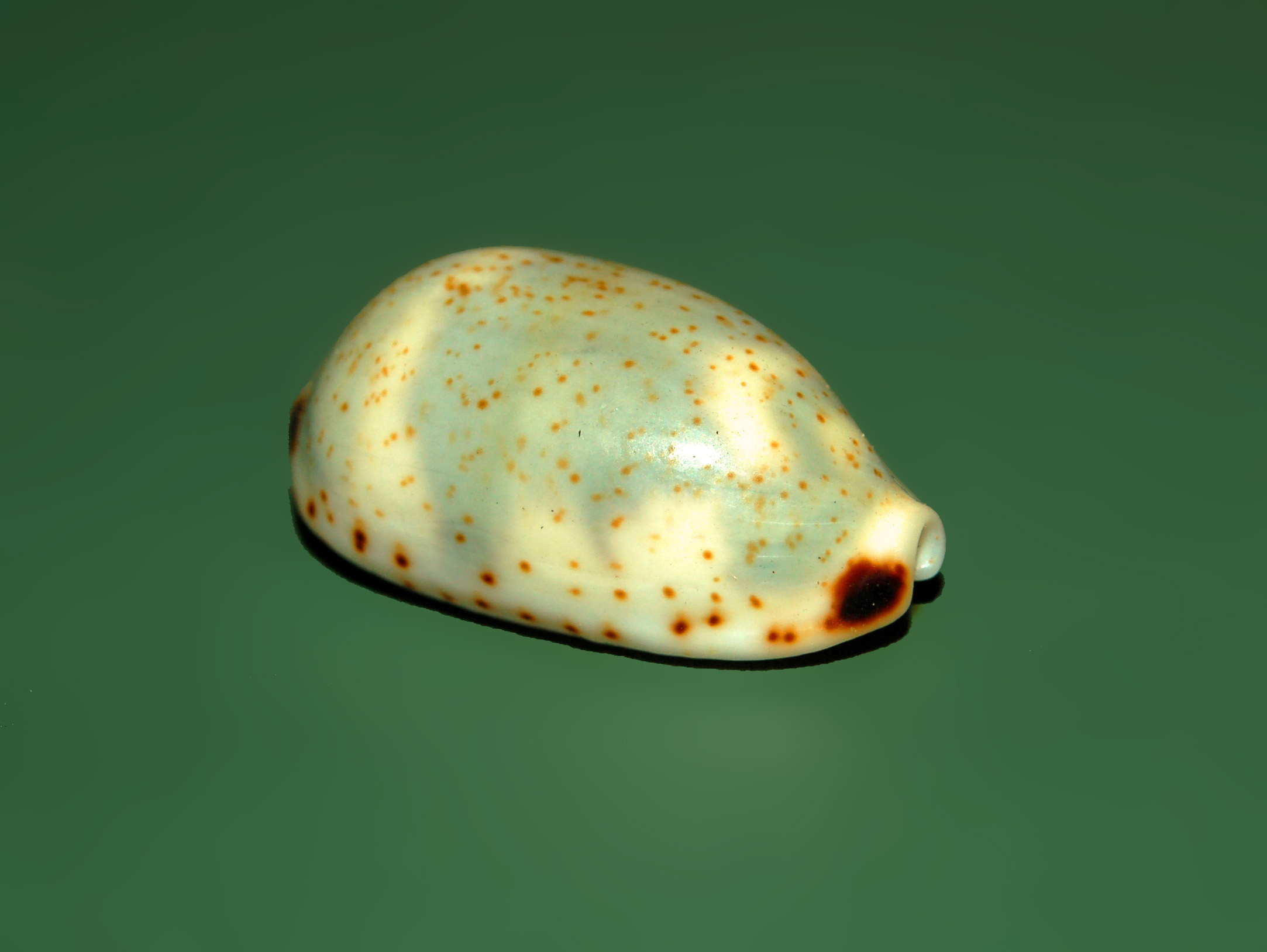
A shell of Bistolida kieneri depriesteri, lateral view, anterior end towards the right

== Distribution ==
This species and its subspecies can be found in East Africa, in the Indian Ocean and in the western Pacific Ocean, in the seas along Aldabra, Chagos, the Comores, Kenya, Madagascar, the Mascarene Basin, Mauritius, Mozambique, Réunion, the Seychelles, Kenya, Tanzania, South Africa, India, Malaysia, Thailand, Vietnam, Philippines and Samoa.

== Habitat ==
Living cowries can be encountered in tropical shallow water, usually hidden during the day under rocks or corals. As a matter of fact they fear the light and only at dawn or dusk they start feeding on algae or coral polyps.
