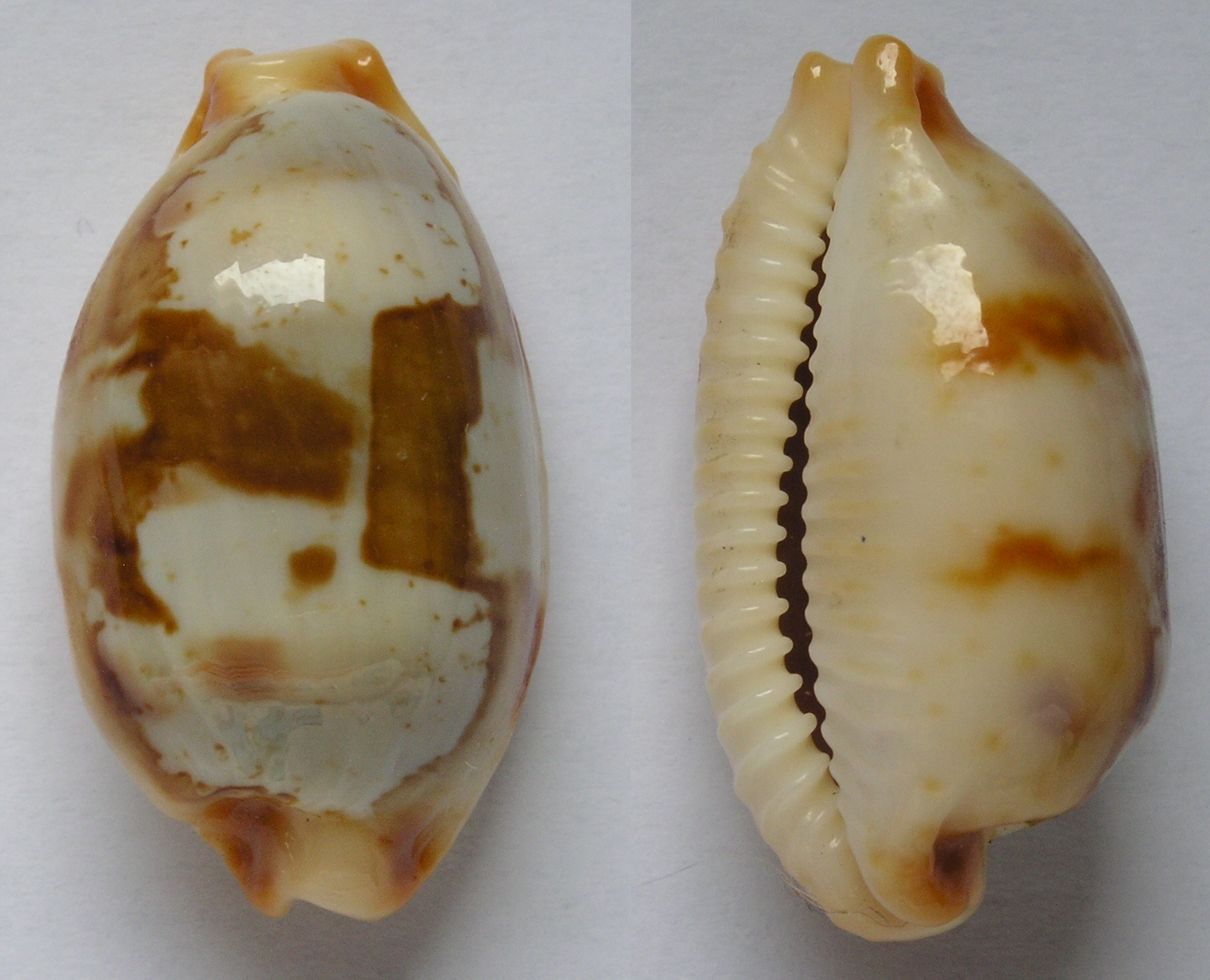
- 2 views of a shell of Bistolida stolida, anterior end towards the top

Scientific classification
- Kingdom: Animalia
- Phylum: Mollusca
- Class: Gastropoda
- Subclass: Caenogastropoda
- Order: Littorinimorpha
- Family: Cypraeidae
- Genus: Bistolida
- Species: B. stolida

Binomial name
- Bistolida stolida (Linnaeus, 1758)

Synonyms
- Blasicrura stolida (Linnaeus, 1758); Cypraea stolida Linnaeus, 1758 (basionym)

= Bistolida stolida =

Species of gastropod

Bistolida stolida, common name the stolid cowrie, is a species of sea snail, a cowry, a marine gastropod mollusc in the family Cypraeidae, the cowries.

== Subspecies ==
The following subspecies are recognized :

- Bistolida stolida brianoi Lorenz, 2002
- Bistolida stolida clavicola Lorenz, 1998
- Bistolida stolida crossei (Marie, E., 1869) (synonyms : Bistolida nandronga Steadman, W.R. & B.C. Cotton, 1943; Bistolida stolida crossei thakau (f) Steadman, W.R. & B.C. Cotton, 1943)
- Bistolida stolida kwajaleinensis (Martin, P. & J. Senders, 1983)
- Bistolida stolida rubiginosa (Gmelin, J.F., 1791)
  - forma : Bistolida stolida rubiginosa rufodentata (f) Biraghi, G., 1976
- Bistolida stolida salaryensis Bozzetti, 2008
  - forma : Bistolida stolida salaryensis fulva (f) Bozzetti, L., 2009
- Bistolida stolida stolida (Linnaeus, 1758) (synonyms : Cypraea draco Röding, P.F., 1798; Cypraea gelasima Melvill, J.C., 1888; Cypraea irvinae Cox, J.C., 1889)
  - forma : Bistolida stolida stolida vietnamensis (f)
- Bistolida stolida uvongoensis Massier, 2004

== Description ==
The shells of these uncommon cowries reach on average 22–30 millimetres (0.87–1.18 in) of length, with a minimum size of 15 millimetres (0.59 in) and a maximum size of 45 millimetres (1.8 in). The dorsum surface is very smooth and shiny, the basic color is blue-gray, white or light tan, with large irregular dark brown dorsal blotches. The margins are decorated with two orange - brown spots. The base may be white or pink, with a long and narrow aperture and long white or brown fine teeth. Both the extremities are more or less rostrated, with an orange brown blotch. In the living cowry the mantle is transparent with white long tree-shaped sensorial papillae and can be completely retracted into the shell.

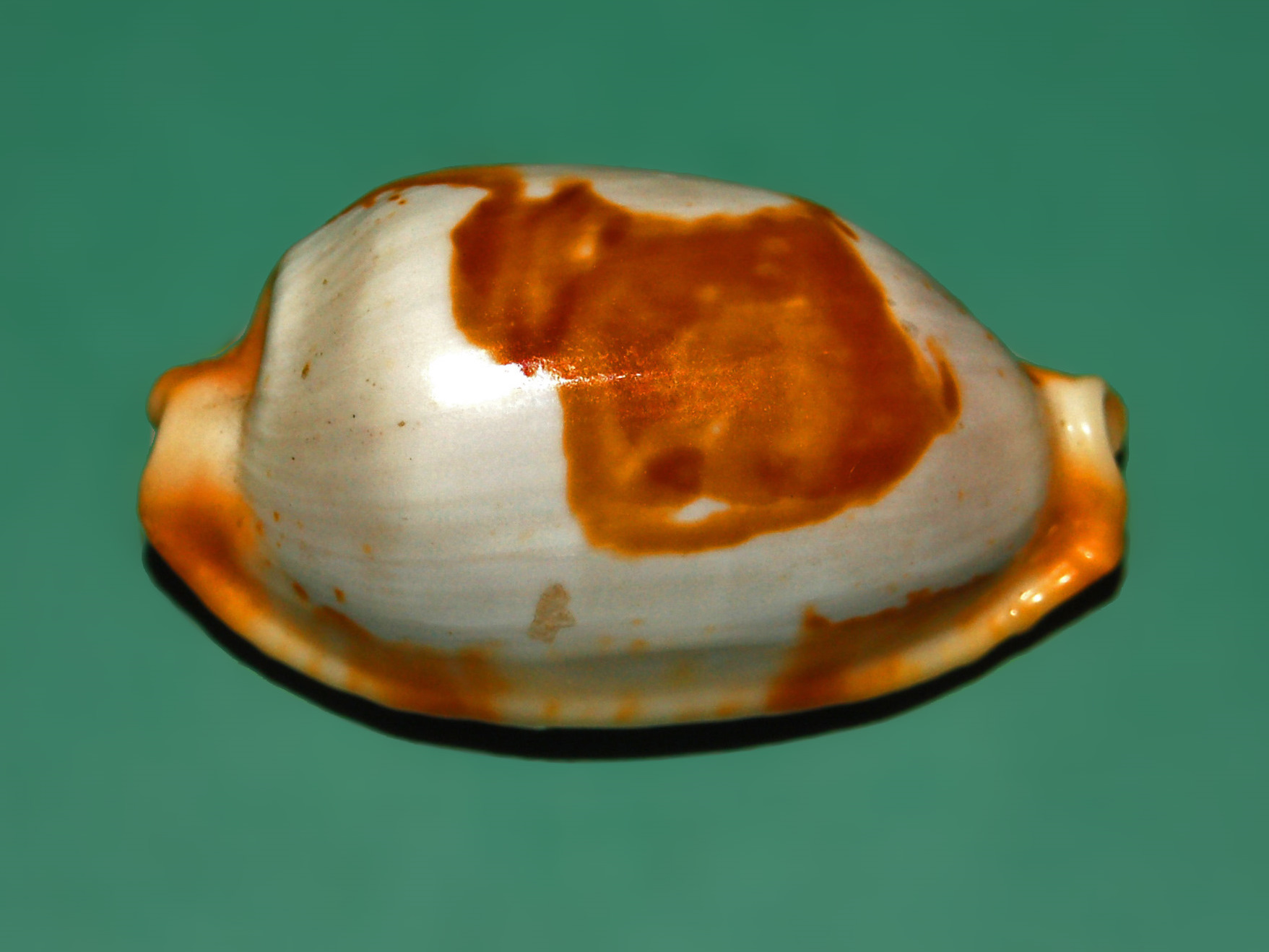
A shell of Bistolida stolida from Philippines, dorsal view, anterior end towards the right

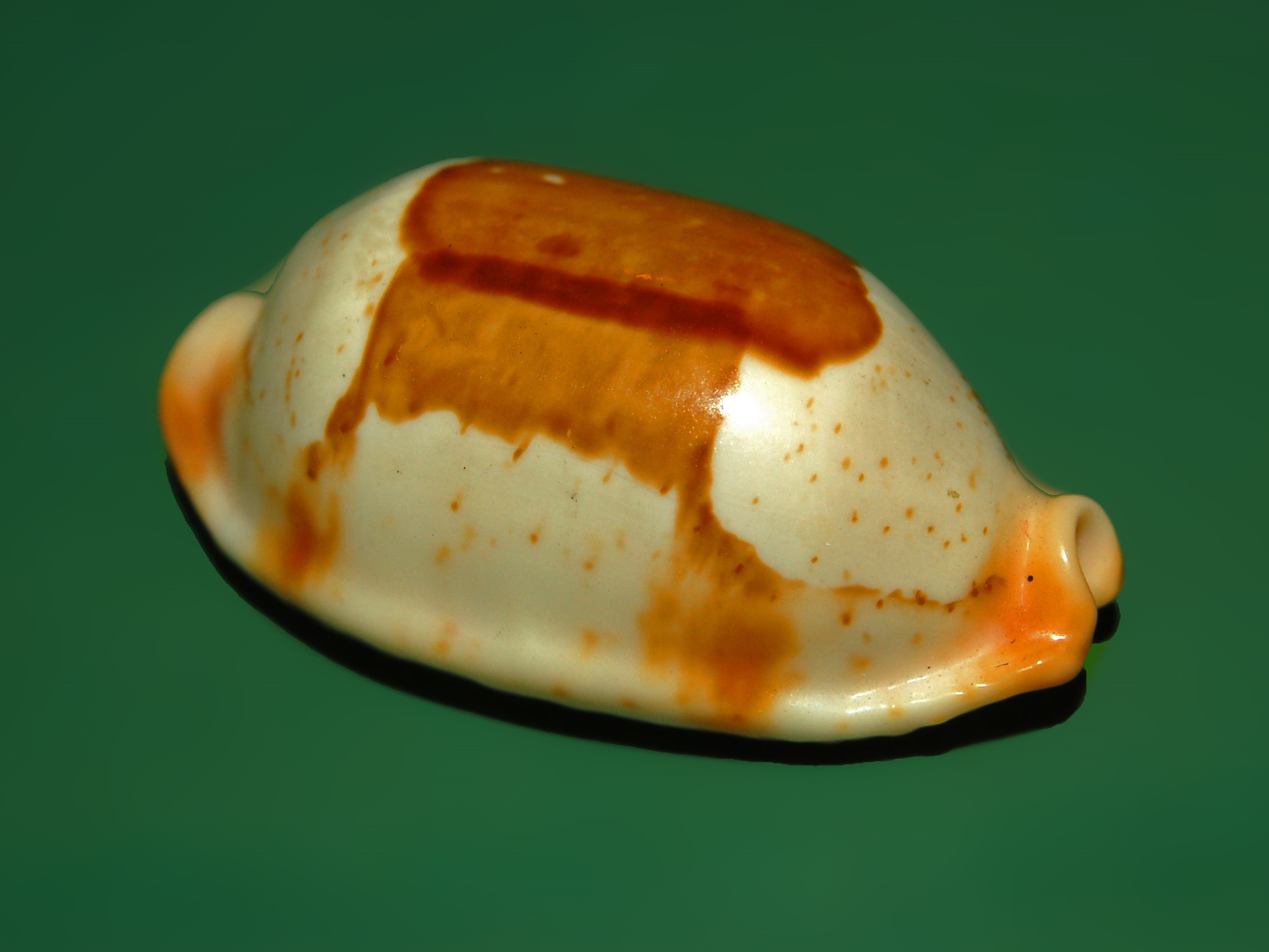
A shell of Bistolida stolida from Philippines, lateral view, anterior end towards the right

== Distribution ==
This species and its subspecies can be found in the seas along Aldabra, Chagos, the Comores, Kenya, Madagascar, the Mascarene Basin, Mauritius, Mozambique, Réunion, the Seychelles, South Africa, Tanzania, in the Indian Ocean and in the Western and Central Pacific Ocean in the Kwajalein Atoll, New Caledonia, Guam, Samoa Islands and the Marshall Islands, Melanesia and along Vietnam, Taiwan, Australia, Sulu Sea, Samar Island and Philippines.

== Habitat ==
These cowries mainly live in tropical intertidal and subtidal zone on coral reefs up to 30 metres (98 ft) of depth. During the day they are usually hidden under rocks and in crevices, as only at dusk they start feeding on sponges or algae.
