= Ovatipsa rashleighana =

Scientific classification
- Kingdom: Animalia
- Phylum: Mollusca
- Class: Gastropoda
- Subclass: Caenogastropoda
- Order: Littorinimorpha
- Family: Cypraeidae
- Genus: Ovatipsa
- Species: O. rashleighana

Binomial name
- Ovatipsa rashleighana (Melvill, 1888)

Synonyms
- Blasicrura rashleighana (Melvill, 1888); Cypraea rashleighana Melvill, 1888 (basionym); Talostolida rashleighana (Melvill, 1888)

Species of gastropod

Ovatipsa rashleighana is a species of cowry, a marine gastropod in the family Cypraeidae. This species occurs in the Indian Ocean.

Subspecues

- Ovatipsa rashleighana pseudoteres (Lorenz & Barbier, 1992)
- Ovatipsa rashleighana rashleighana (Melvill, 1888)
