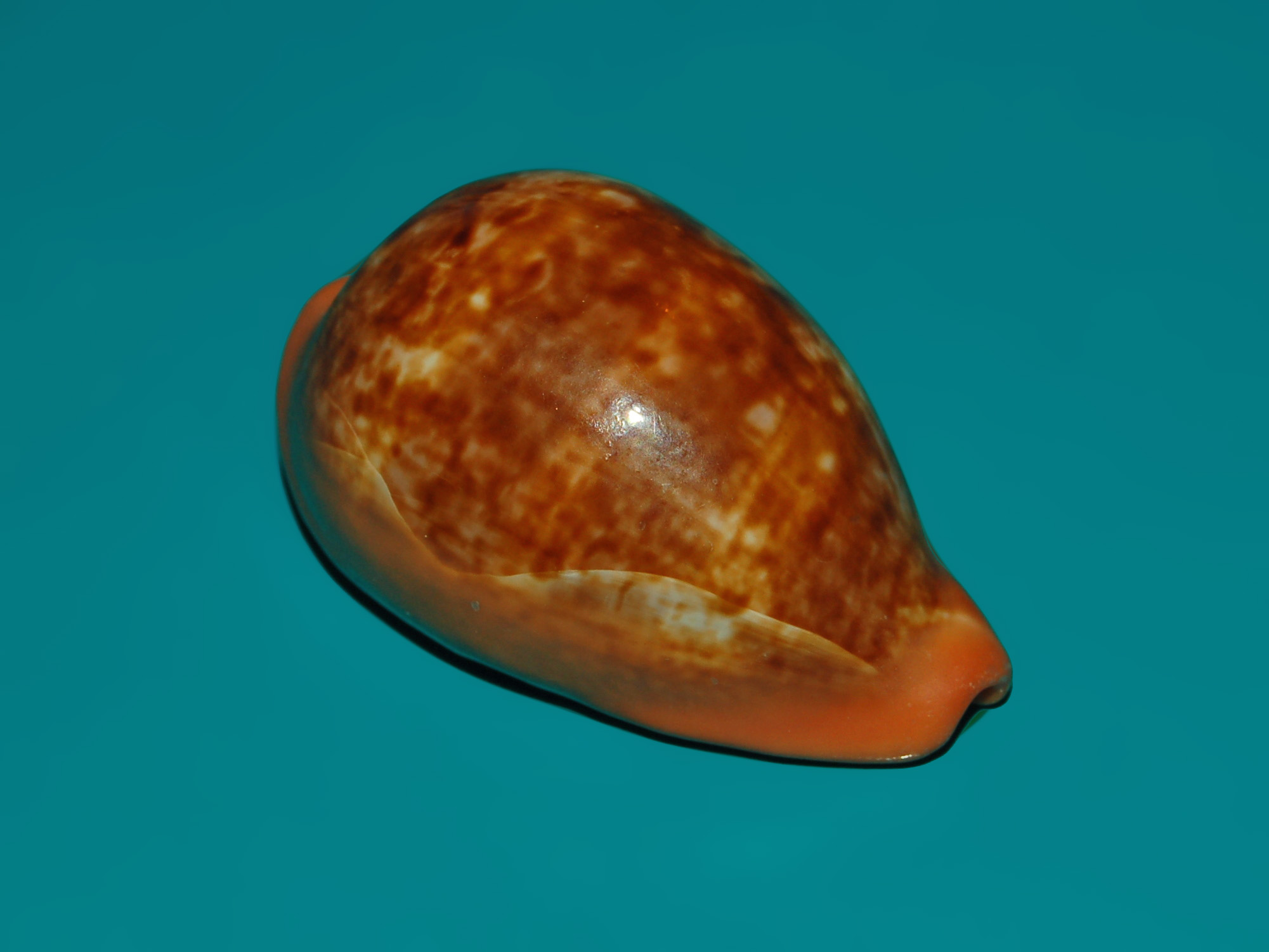
- Shells of Zonaria pyrum

Scientific classification
- Kingdom: Animalia
- Phylum: Mollusca
- Class: Gastropoda
- Subclass: Caenogastropoda
- Order: Littorinimorpha
- Superfamily: Cypraeoidea
- Family: Cypraeidae
- Genus: Zonaria; Jousseaume, 1884

Synonyms
- Cypraea (Zonaria) Jousseaume, 1884 · unaccepted; Zonaria (Zonaria) Jousseaume, 1884

= Zonaria (gastropod) =

Zonaria Temporal range: Paleocene - Recent

Genus of gastropods

Zonaria is a genus of sea snails, marine gastropod molluscs in the subfamily Zonariinae of the family Cypraeidae, the cowries.

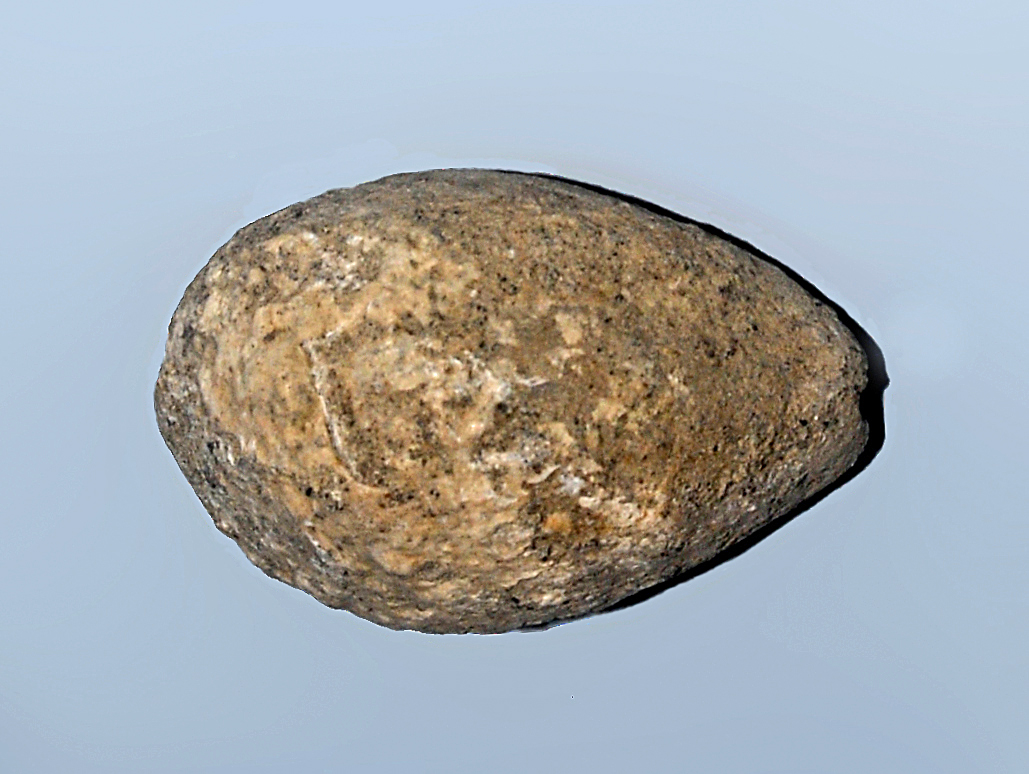
Fossil shell of Zonaria subexcisa

== Species ==
Species within the genus Zonaria include:

- † Zonaria amandula (Dolin & Lozouet, 2004)
- Zonaria angelicae (Clover, 1974)
- Zonaria angolensis (Odhner, 1923)
- † Zonaria frassinettii L. T. Groves & S. N. Nielsen
- † Zonaria ledoni Dolin & Lozouet, 2004
- Zonaria petitiana (Crosse, 1872)
- Zonaria picta (Gray, 1824)
- † Zonaria porcellus (Brocchi, 1814)
- Zonaria pyrum (Gmelin, 1791)
- Zonaria sanguinolenta (Gmelin, 1791)
- Zonaria zonaria (Gmelin, 1791)

Synonyms

- Zonaria (Zonaria) annettae (Dall, 1909): synonym of Pseudozonaria annettae (Dall, 1909)
- Zonaria piriformis Locard, 1886: synonym of Zonaria pyrum pyrum (Gmelin, 1791) (unjustified emendation)
- Zonaria spadicea (Swainson, 1823): synonym of Neobernaya spadicea (Swainson, 1823)
- † Zonaria utriculata (Lamarck, 1810): synonym of † Schilderina utriculata (Lamarck, 1810)

== Extinct species ==
Extinct species within the genus Zonaria include:

- † Zonaria amandula (Dolin & Lozouet, 2004)
- † Zonaria angolensis (Odhner, 1923)
- † Zonaria dertamygdaloides Sacco 1894
- † Zonaria fabagina Lamarck 1810
- † Zonaria frassinettii L. T. Groves & S. N. Nielsen
- † Zonaria heilprinii Dall 1890
- † Zonaria ledoni Dolin & Lozouet, 2004
- † Zonaria mariaelisabethae Dolin 1991
- † Zonaria pingata Landau and Groves 2011
- † Zonaria pittorum Groves 1997
- † Zonaria porcellus (Brocchi, 1814)
- † Zonaria praelatior Dolin 1991
- † Zonaria pseudotumulus Landau and Groves 2011
- † Zonaria shirleyae Dolin 1991
- † Zonaria subexcisa Braun 1840
- † Zonaria theresae Dolin 1991
- † Zonaria travancorica Dey 1961
- † Zonaria tumulus Heilprin 1886

Fossils of species within this genus have been found in sediments of Europe, United States, Venezuela, India, Pakistan and Somalia from Paleocene to Quaternary (age range: 61.7 to 0.012 million years ago).

== See also ==
- List of marine gastropod genera in the fossil record
