= Zonaria angelicae =

Scientific classification
- Kingdom: Animalia
- Phylum: Mollusca
- Class: Gastropoda
- Subclass: Caenogastropoda
- Order: Littorinimorpha
- Family: Cypraeidae
- Genus: Zonaria
- Species: Z. angelicae

Binomial name
- Zonaria angelicae (Clover, 1974)

Synonyms
- Cypraea angelicae Clover, 1974 superseded combination; Zonaria angelicae angelicae (Clover, 1974); Zonaria pyrum angelicae (Clover, 1974)

Species of gastropod

Zonaria angelicae is a species of sea snail, a cowry, a marine gastropod mollusc in the family Cypraeidae, the cowries.

== Synonyms ==
- Subspecies Zonaria angelicae angelicae (Clover, 1974): synonym of Zonaria angelicae (Clover, 1974)
- Variety Zonaria angelicae var. petiformis Lorenz & F. Huber, 1993: synonym of Zonaria pyrum petitiana (Crosse, 1872): synonym of Zonaria petitiana (Crosse, 1872)

== Description ==
The length of the shell varies between 17 mm and 35 mm.

== Distribution ==
This marine species occurs off Senegal and Gabon.
