= Psychoides phaedrospora =

Scientific classification
- Kingdom: Animalia
- Phylum: Arthropoda
- Class: Insecta
- Order: Lepidoptera
- Family: Tineidae
- Genus: Psychoides
- Species: P. phaedrospora

Binomial name
- Psychoides phaedrospora Meyrick, 1935

Species of moth

Psychoides phaedrospora is a moth of the family Tineidae, first described by Edward Meyrick in 1935. It is found in Japan.
