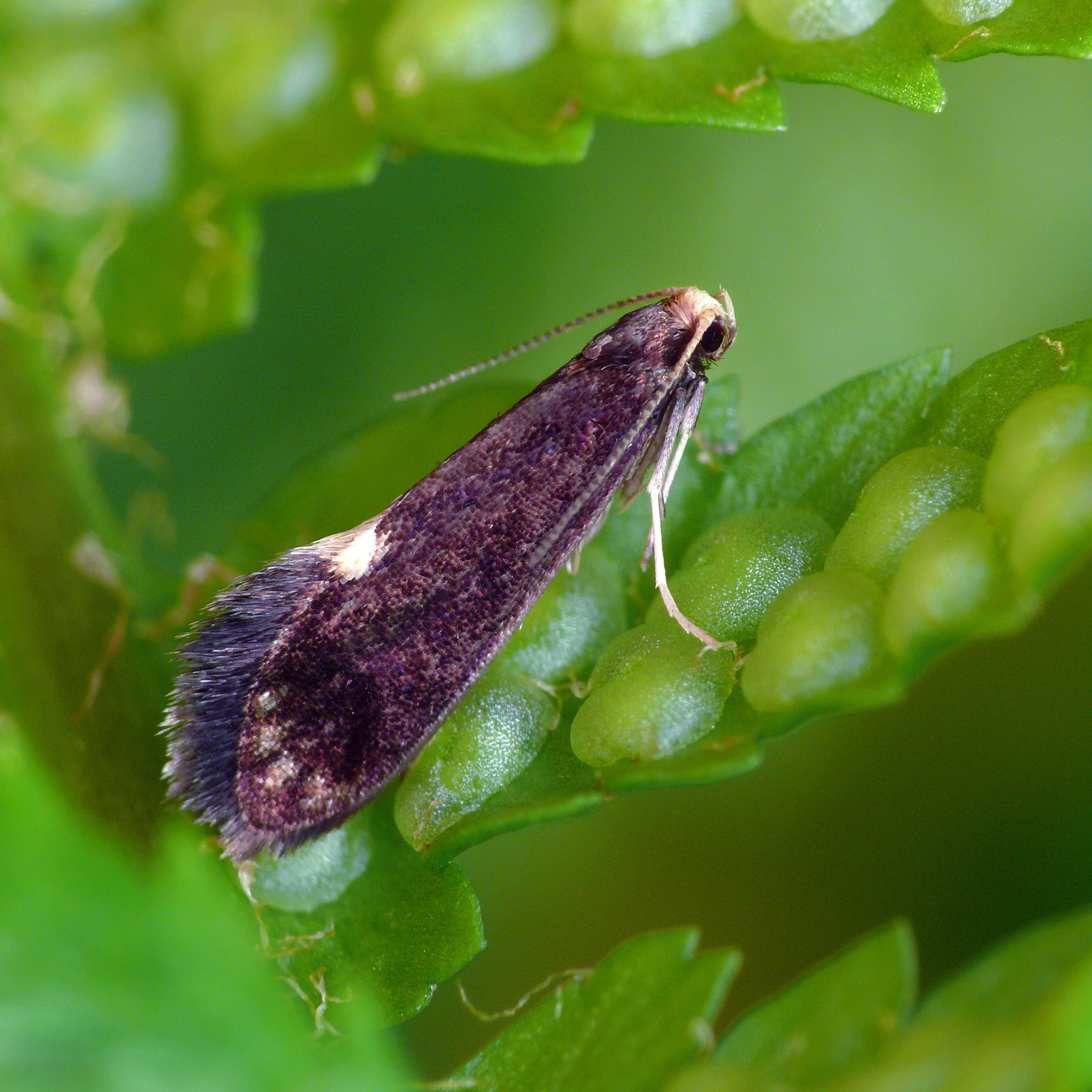

Scientific classification
- Kingdom: Animalia
- Phylum: Arthropoda
- Class: Insecta
- Order: Lepidoptera
- Family: Tineidae
- Genus: Psychoides
- Species: P. filicivora

Binomial name
- Psychoides filicivora Meyrick, 1937

Synonyms
- Mnesipatris filicivora Meyrick, 1937

= Psychoides filicivora =

Species of moth

Psychoides filicivora is a moth of the family Tineidae first described by Edward Meyrick in 1937. First found in Ireland in 1909, it is possible that the moth was introduced from imported ferns from Asia. The moth can be found from spring though autumn in a series of generations. The species overwinters as a larva.

== Life cycle ==
=== Larva ===
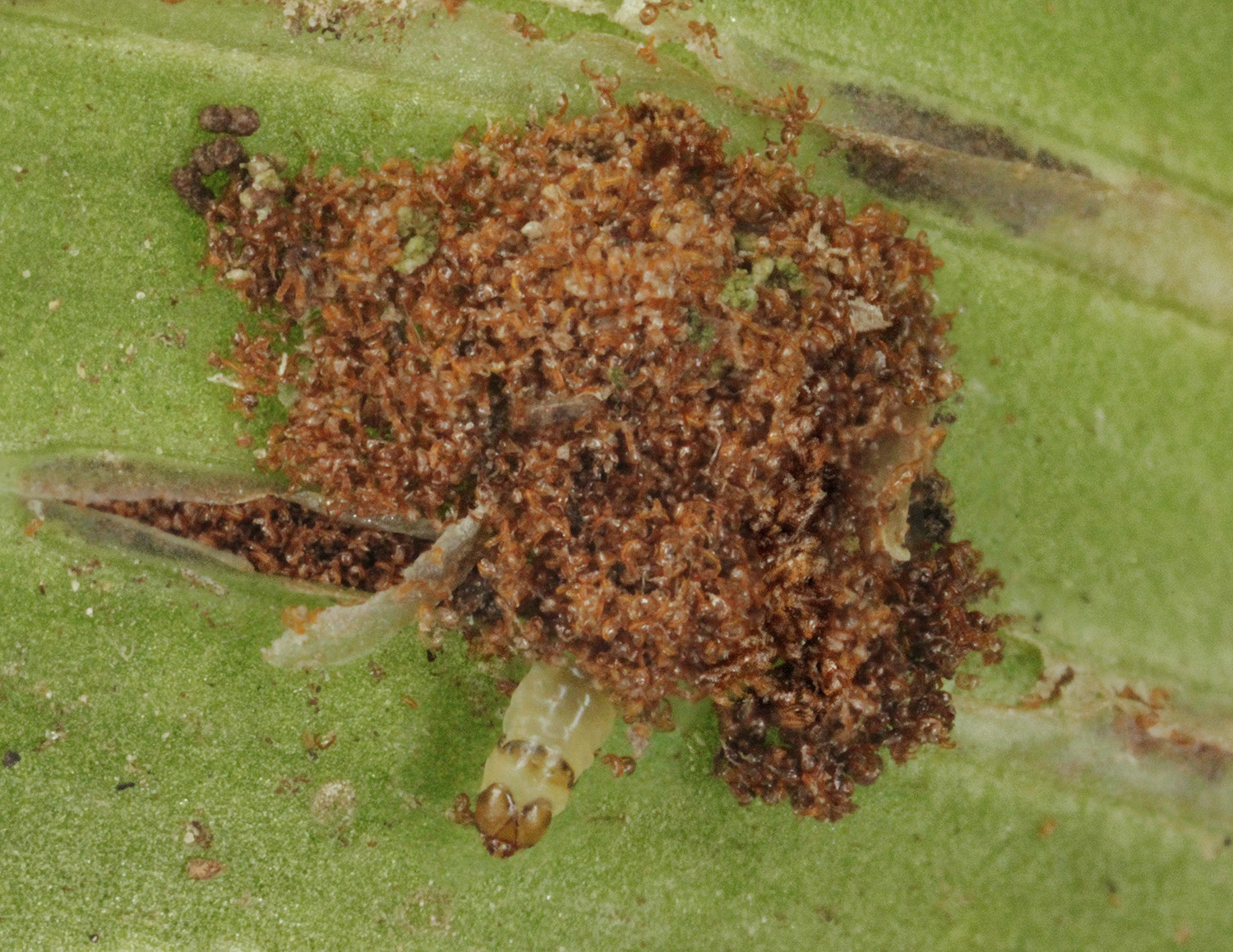

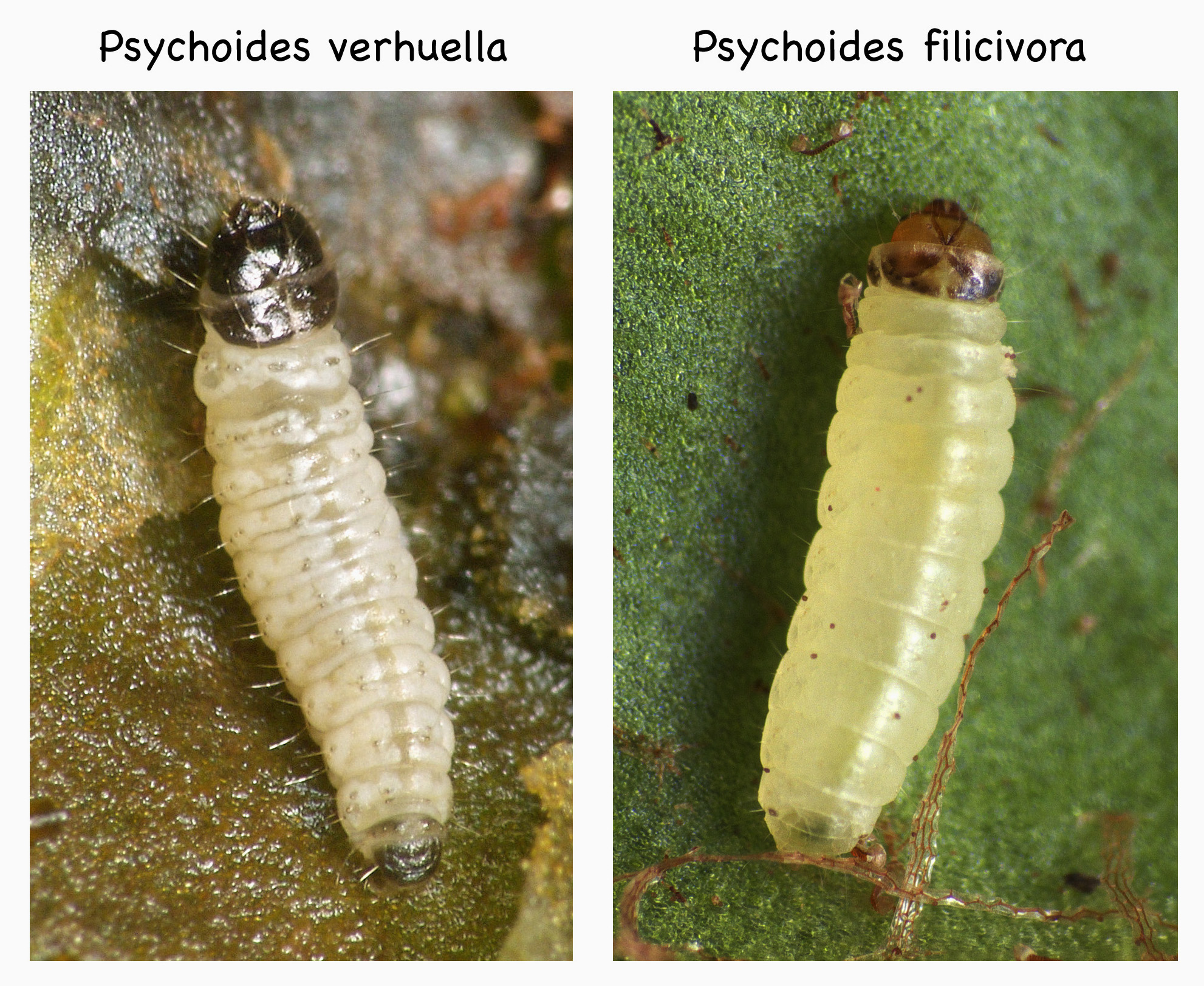

Larvae live on a variety of ferns feeding on the sporangia, or the lower surface of the frond, under the cover of sporangia spun in an irregular pile. The feeding signs of the similar fern-feeding moth, P. verhuella form a loose portable case out of spun sporangia and looks like misplaced sorus. The feeding causes browning of the upper frond. Fully grown, the larvae are c. 4–5 mm long with a pale-brown head and a pale-brown posterial margin, which has a split in the middle. The pale-brown head, translucent prothoracic plate and pale-brown tail distinguish P. filicivora from the similar larvae of P. verhuella, which has a black head and black prothoracic plate.

The following ferns have been recorded as food plants,

- soft shield-fern (Polystichum setiferum)
- male fern (Dryopteris filix-mas)
- hart-tongue fern (Phyllitis scolopendrium)
- black spleenwort (Asplenium adiantum-nigrum)
- maidenhair spleenwort (Asplenium trichomanes)
- western polypody (Polypodium hesperium)

=== Pupa ===
Pupa are found on the underside of a frond, usually in a tough white cocoon covered in sporangia. Sometimes uncovered.

=== Imago ===
The moths can be found from spring to autumn in a succession of generations. The wingspan is 10 to 12 mm. They have pale patches on the tornus of their dark forewings which form an approximate diamond shape when the wings are closed. They tend to fly in early morning sunshine, late afternoon and at any time on dull days. Can be found in high numbers. Rarely comes to light.

== History and distribution ==
The moth was first discovered by Bryan Beirne at Seapoint, County Dublin, Ireland, which is the type locality. Specimens from the same locality, which had been collected earlier, were later found dating back to 1909. The first published record from elsewhere is from Bournemouth, England, in 1940, although it is possible it was found in c. 1856 by a Mr Drane at Caerphilly, Wales. He found larvae on wall-rue (Asplenium ruta-muraria), which at the time was identified as P. verhuella, but is much more likely to be P. filicivora. Since 1940 it has been found mainly in coastal locations in England, Northern Ireland and Wales. In the 1990s, the moth was found in undisturbed laurel forests in Madeira and may be a native species. There is a related species in Japan and most sources consider it possible that the moth was imported from Asia on ferns; but it could be endemic to Madeira, and imported to Britain and Ireland on ferns from there.

== Bibliography ==
- Pelham-Clinton, E. C. (1985). "Tiniedae". In Heath, John (ed.). The Moths and Butterflies of Great Britain and Ireland. Vol. 2. Colchester: Harley Books. pp. 152–208. ISBN 0-946589-19-4.
