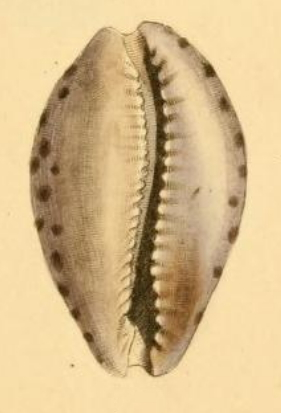
- Shell of Zonaria picta (holotype)

Scientific classification
- Kingdom: Animalia
- Phylum: Mollusca
- Class: Gastropoda
- Subclass: Caenogastropoda
- Order: Littorinimorpha
- Family: Cypraeidae
- Genus: Zonaria
- Species: Z. picta

Binomial name
- Zonaria picta (Gray, 1824)

Synonyms
- Cypraea picta J. E. Gray, 1824 superseded combination; Monetaria atava Rochebrune, 1884 junior subjective synonym

= Zonaria picta =

Species of gastropod

Zonaria picta, common name the painted cowry, is a species of sea snail, a cowry, a marine gastropod mollusc in the family Cypraeidae, the cowries.

== Description ==
The length of the shell varies between 17 mm and 38 mm.

(Original description) The ovate oblong shell is whitish, with three obscure brown bands, and the back ornamented with numerous pale, bright brown specks, and scattered large spots. The spire is concave and covered. The base is rather convex and is purplish white. The margin is livid purple, ornamented with a few scattered large round purple brown spots, thickened, rounded, slightly extended at the extremities, which are violet brown on the upper part. The aperture is rather wide and is purplish white. The teeth of the inner lip are small, close, except the four anterior ones, which are larger and more distant. The teeth of the outer lip are larger, rather distant and blunt. The columella is rather convex and smooth. Within it is purple.

== Distribution ==
This marine species occurs off West Africa: Cape Verde Islands, Senegal to Gambia
