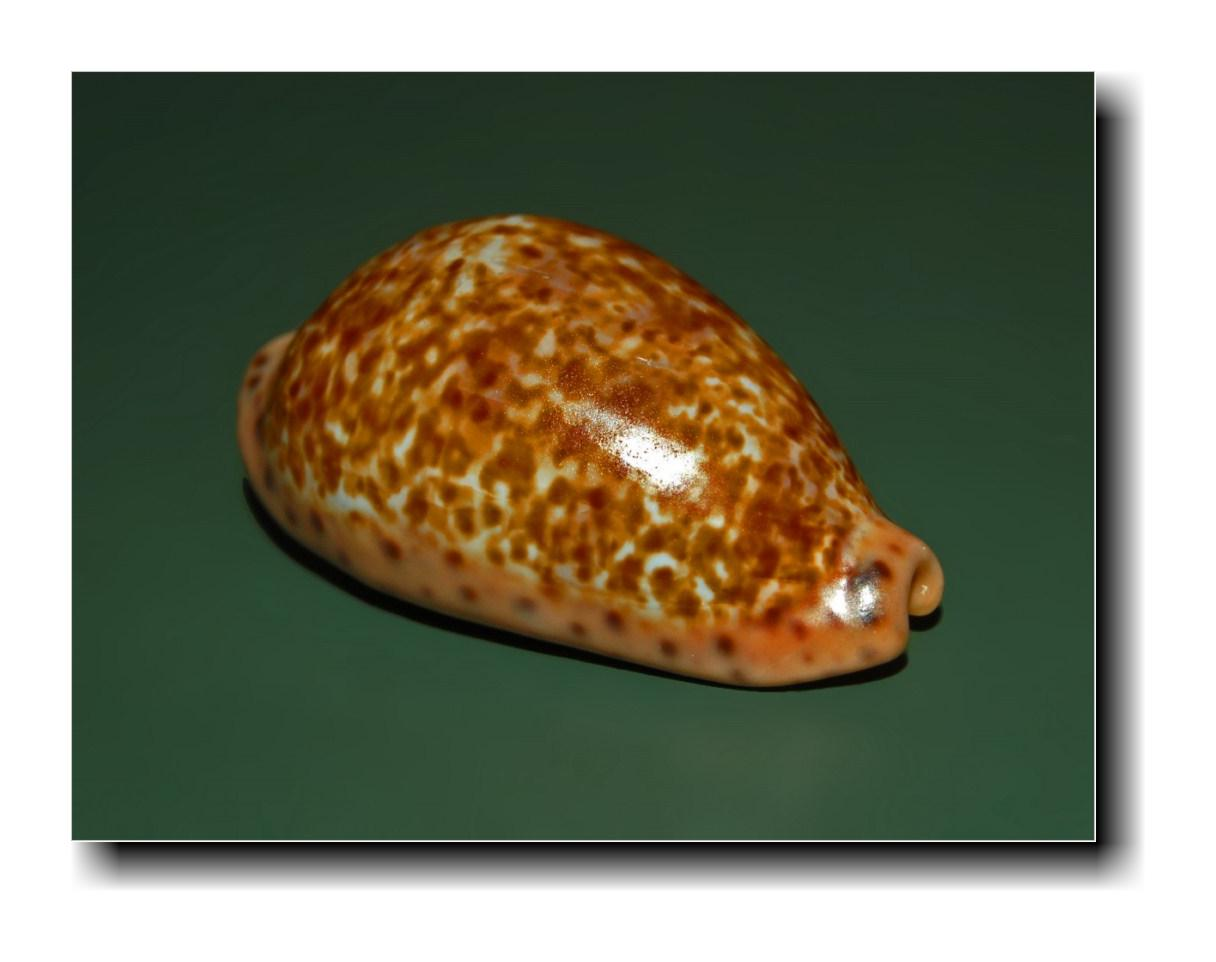
- A shell of Pseudozonaria annettae from Nicaragua, anterior end towards the right

Scientific classification
- Kingdom: Animalia
- Phylum: Mollusca
- Class: Gastropoda
- Subclass: Caenogastropoda
- Order: Littorinimorpha
- Superfamily: Cypraeoidea
- Family: Cypraeidae
- Genus: Pseudozonaria; Schilder, 1929

Type species
- Cypraea arabicula Lamarck, 1810

Synonyms
- Plaziatia Dolin & Lozouet, 2004

= Pseudozonaria =

Genus of gastropods

Pseudozonaria is a genus of sea snails, marine gastropod mollusks in the subfamily Zonariinae of the family Cypraeidae, the cowries.

== Species ==
Species within the genus Pseudozonaria include:

- Pseudozonaria arabicula (Lamarck, 1811)
- Pseudozonaria annettae (Dall, 1909)
- Pseudozonaria nigropunctata (Gray, 1828)
- Pseudozonaria robertsi (Hidalgo, 1906)

Synonyms

- Pseudozonaria aequinoctialis (Schilder, 1933): synonym of Pseudozonaria annettae aequinoctialis (Schilder, 1933) (No conchological or molecular differentiation to warrant species recognition)
