= Psychoides =

Scientific classification
- Kingdom: Animalia
- Phylum: Arthropoda
- Clade: Pancrustacea
- Class: Insecta
- Order: Lepidoptera
- Family: Tineidae
- Genus: Psychoides; Bruand, 1853

Synonyms
- Teichobia Herrich-Schäffer

Genus of moths

Psychoides is a genus of moths belonging to the family Tineidae. The type species is Psychoides verhuella first described by, the French entomologist, Charles Bruand in 1853. Bruand also erected the genus.

== Ecology ==
The moths fly during the day and resemble the Incurvariidae, in which family P. filicivora was first described. They have a flat body and wings are held in a tent-like position. The Psychoides are unusual amongst the Tineidae with the larvae feeding on green plants, i.e. ferns instead of fungi, lichen or dry animal or plant debris.

== Species ==
Psychoides are distributed in the Oriental and Palaearctic regions. Only four species are known, with P. gosari being added to the list in 2007 following the discovery of pupae in Korea from 2004 to 2006.

- Psychoides filicivora (Meyrick, 1937)
- Psychoides gosari Kim & Bae, 2007
- Psychoides phaedrospora Meyrick, 1935)
- Psychoides verhuella Bruand, 1853

== Gallery ==
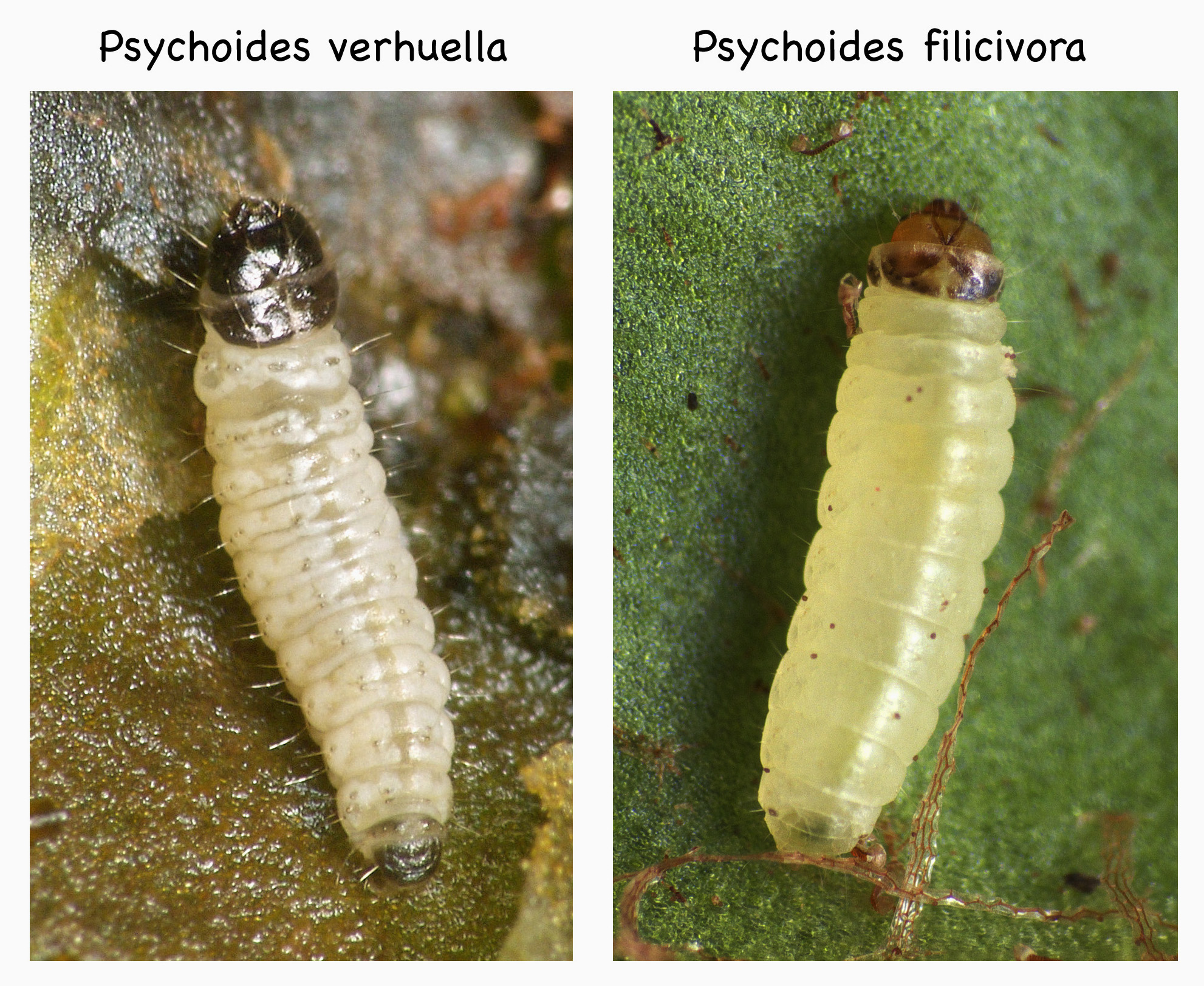
Larvae of Psychoides verhuella and Psychoides filicivora

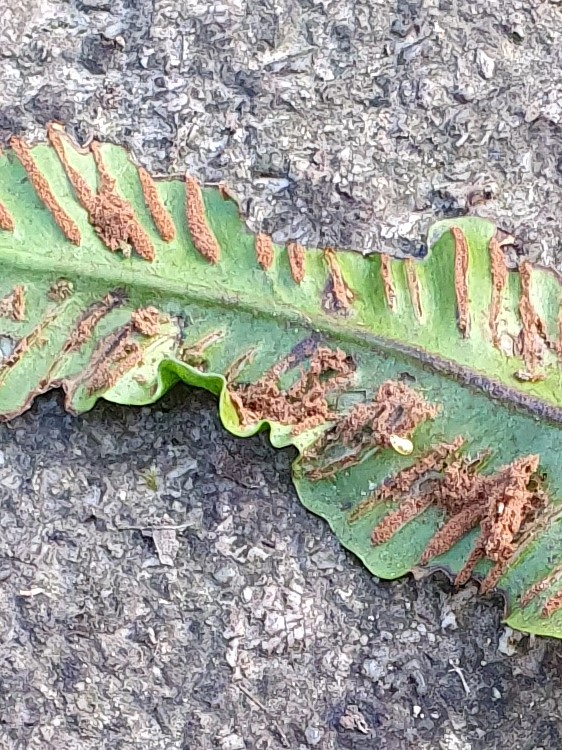
Psychoides filicivora feeding signs on hart's-tongue fern

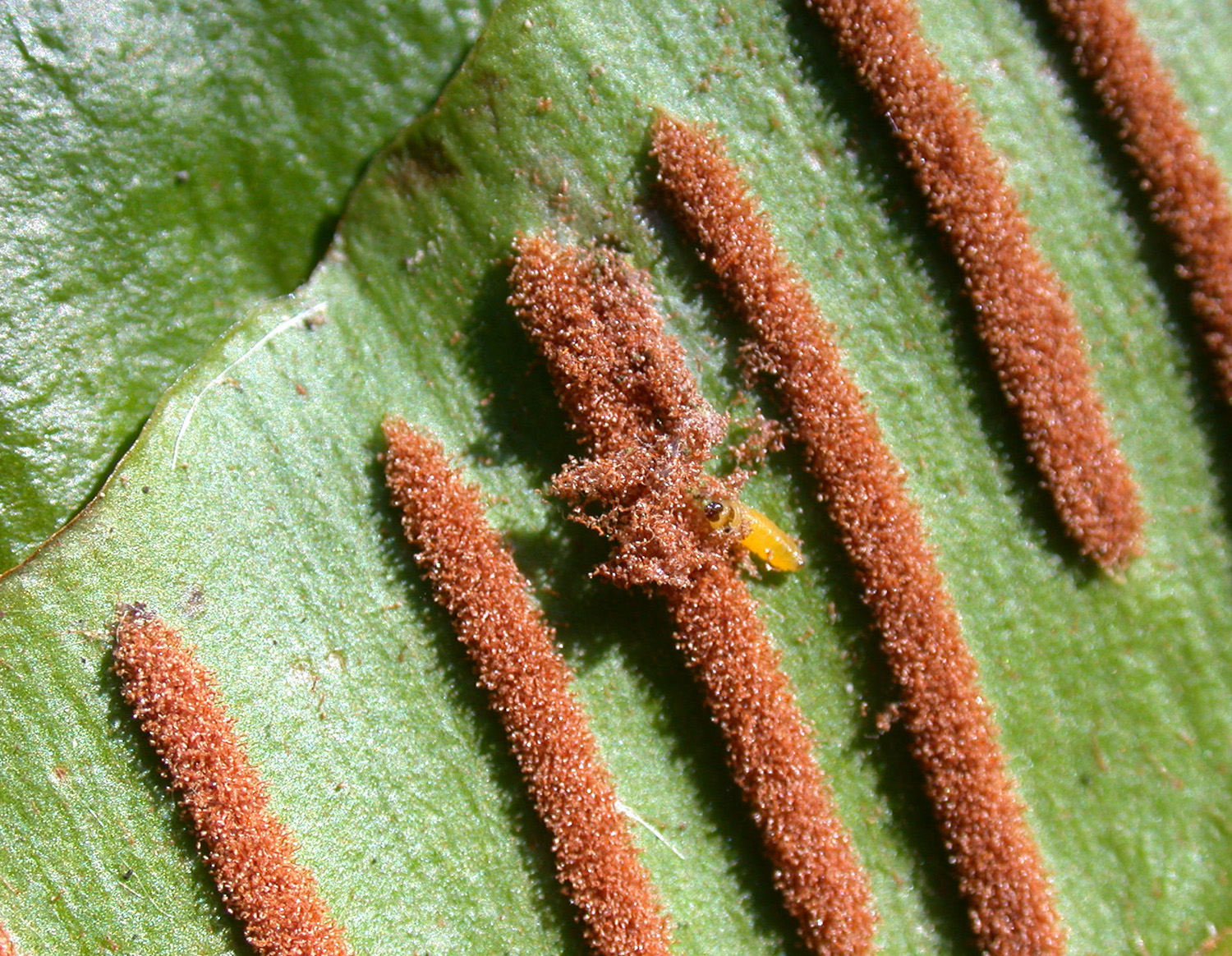
Psychoides verhuella feeding signs

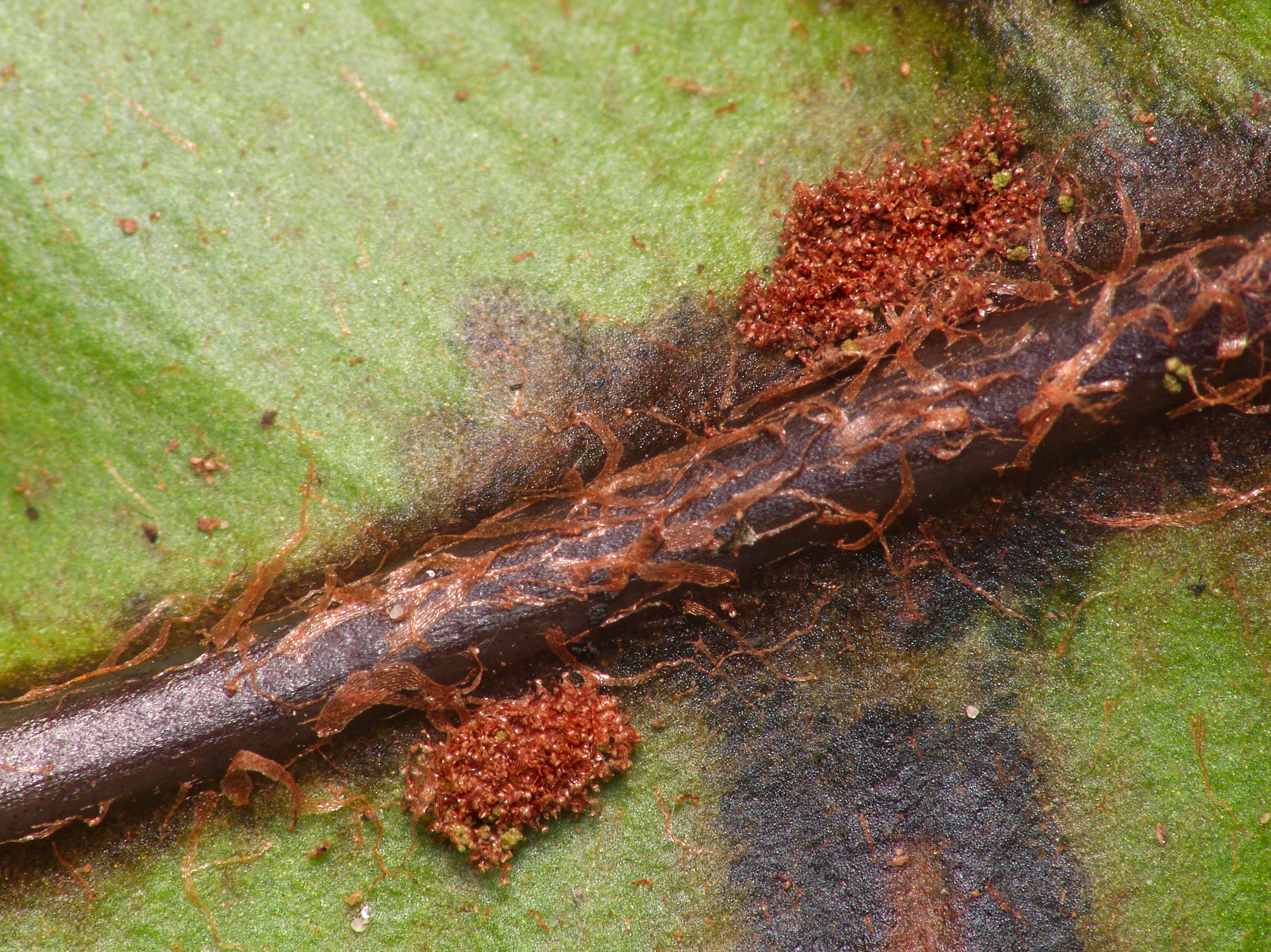
Psychoides verhuella larval cases

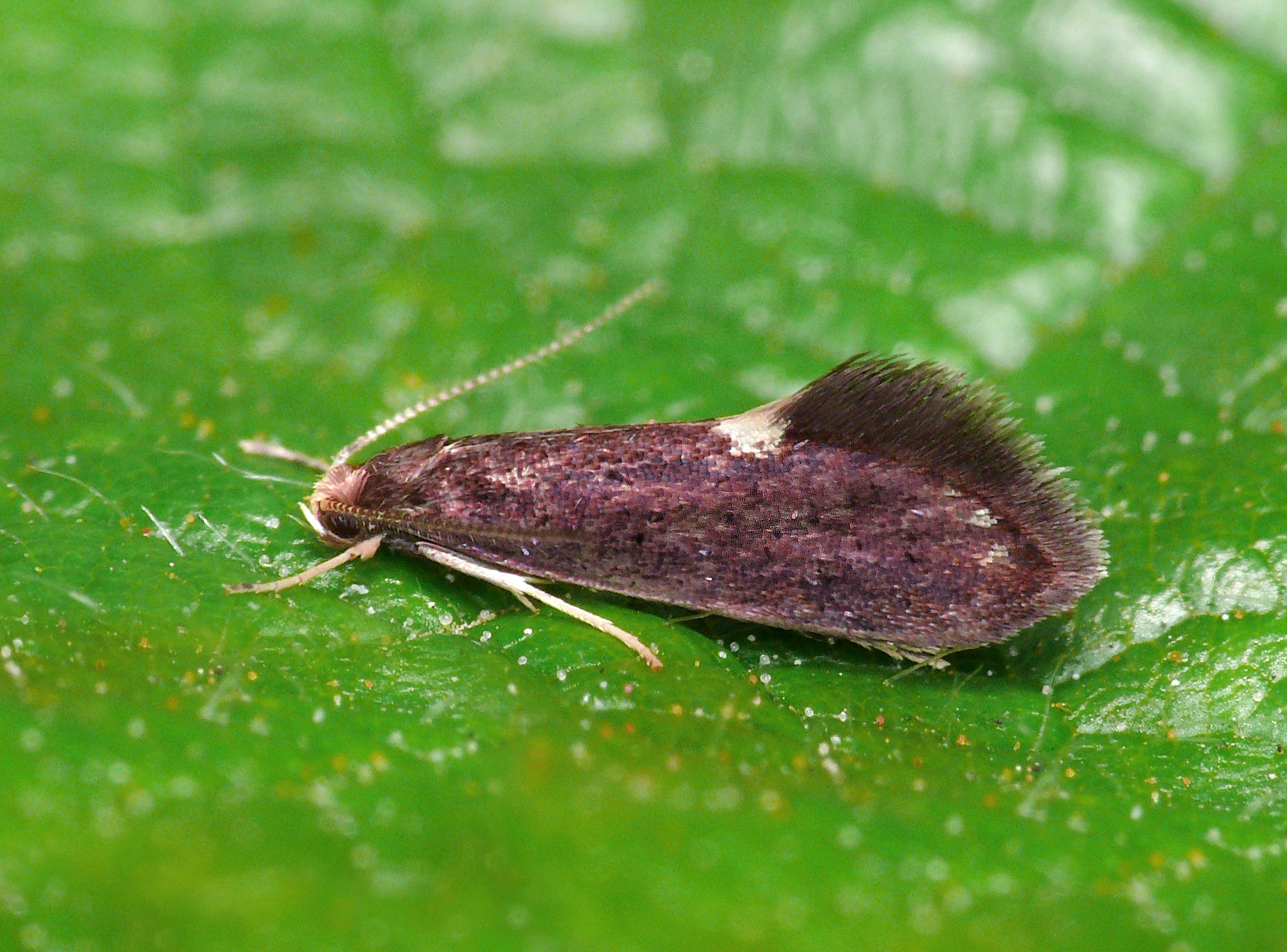
Psychoides filicivora

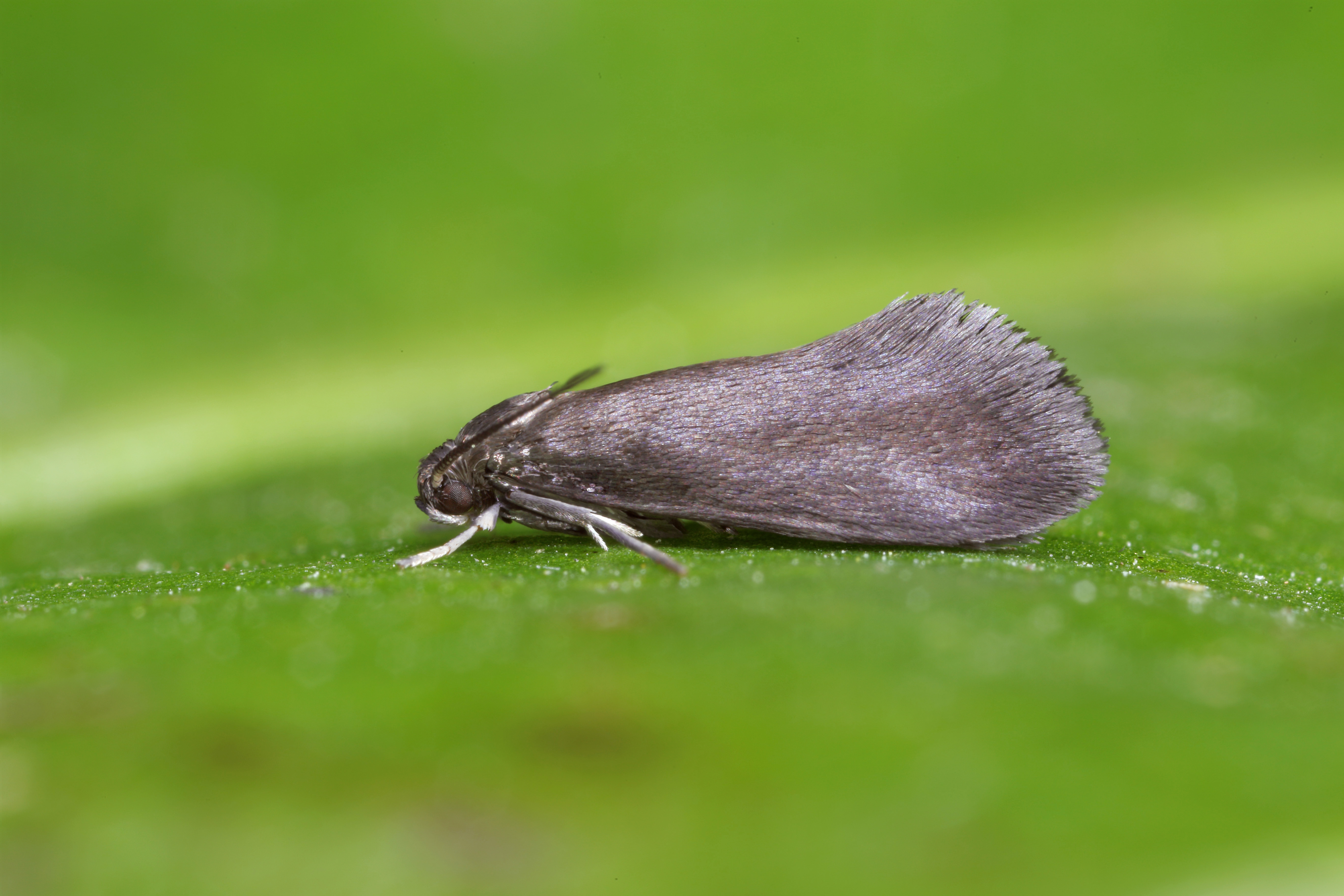
Psychoides verhuella

== Etymology ==
Psychoides was raised by Charles Braund in 1853 and comes from psukhē – of the soul, i.e. a moth of the family Psychidae and eidos – form, that is from the similarity of this species to moths of the Psychidae.

== Bibliography ==
- Pelham-Clinton, E. C. (1985). "Tiniedae". In Heath, John (ed.). The Moths and Butterflies of Great Britain and Ireland. Vol. 2. Colchester: Harley Books. pp. 152–208. ISBN 0-946589-19-4.
