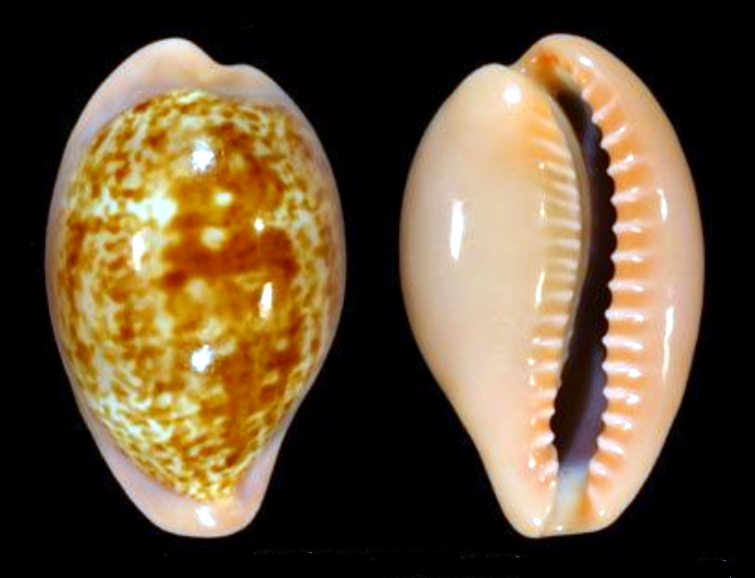
- Shell of Zonaria petitiana (specimen at the Natural History Museum Rotterdam)

Scientific classification
- Kingdom: Animalia
- Phylum: Mollusca
- Class: Gastropoda
- Subclass: Caenogastropoda
- Order: Littorinimorpha
- Family: Cypraeidae
- Genus: Zonaria
- Species: Z. petitiana

Binomial name
- Zonaria petitiana (Crosse, 1872)

Synonyms
- Cypraea petitiana Crosse, 1872 superseded combination; Zonaria angelicae var. petiformis Lorenz & F. Huber, 1993; Zonaria pyrum petitiana (Crosse, 1872)

= Zonaria petitiana =

Species of gastropod

Zonaria petitiana is a species of sea snail, a cowry, a marine gastropod mollusc in the family Cypraeidae, the cowries.

Synonyms

- Zonaria petitiana senegalensis F. A. Schilder, 1928: synonym of Zonaria pyrum insularum F. A. Schilder, 1928

== Taxonomy ==
Some authors consider Z. petitiana a subspecies of Zonaria pyrum, e.g. Lorenz and Hubert, 2000, although Lorenz 2002 considers it a valid species.

== Description ==
The length of the shell varies between 17 mm and 38 mm.

(Original description in Latin) The shell exhibits an ovate-pyriform shape, characterized by a somewhat turgid and thickened form. It possesses a glossy surface and tapers towards both extremities, culminating in a slight beak. The upper surface displays a chestnut-brown coloration, irregularly suffused with large, rounded white spots. The sides and extremities exhibit a broad flesh-colored hue. The lower surface appears flatter, displaying a flesh-colored tone. The columellar margin is adorned with 16 white teeth, while the external margin features 18. The spire is immersed and inconspicuous, with a slight concavity. The aperture is narrow, slightly sinuous, and exhibits a bluish-white coloration internally.

== Distribution ==
This marine species occurs off Senegal and Gabon
