= Zonaria angolensis =

Scientific classification
- Kingdom: Animalia
- Phylum: Mollusca
- Class: Gastropoda
- Subclass: Caenogastropoda
- Order: Littorinimorpha
- Family: Cypraeidae
- Genus: Zonaria
- Species: Z. angolensis

Binomial name
- Zonaria angolensis (Odhner, 1923)

Synonyms
- Cypraea porcellus var. angolensis Odhner, 1923; Zonaria pyrum angolensis (Odhner, 1923)

Species of gastropod

Zonaria angolensis is a species of sea snail, a cowry, a marine gastropod mollusc in the family Cypraeidae, the cowries.

== Description ==
The length of the shell varies between 21 mm and 39 mm.

== Distribution ==
This marine species occurs off Angola and Gabon.
