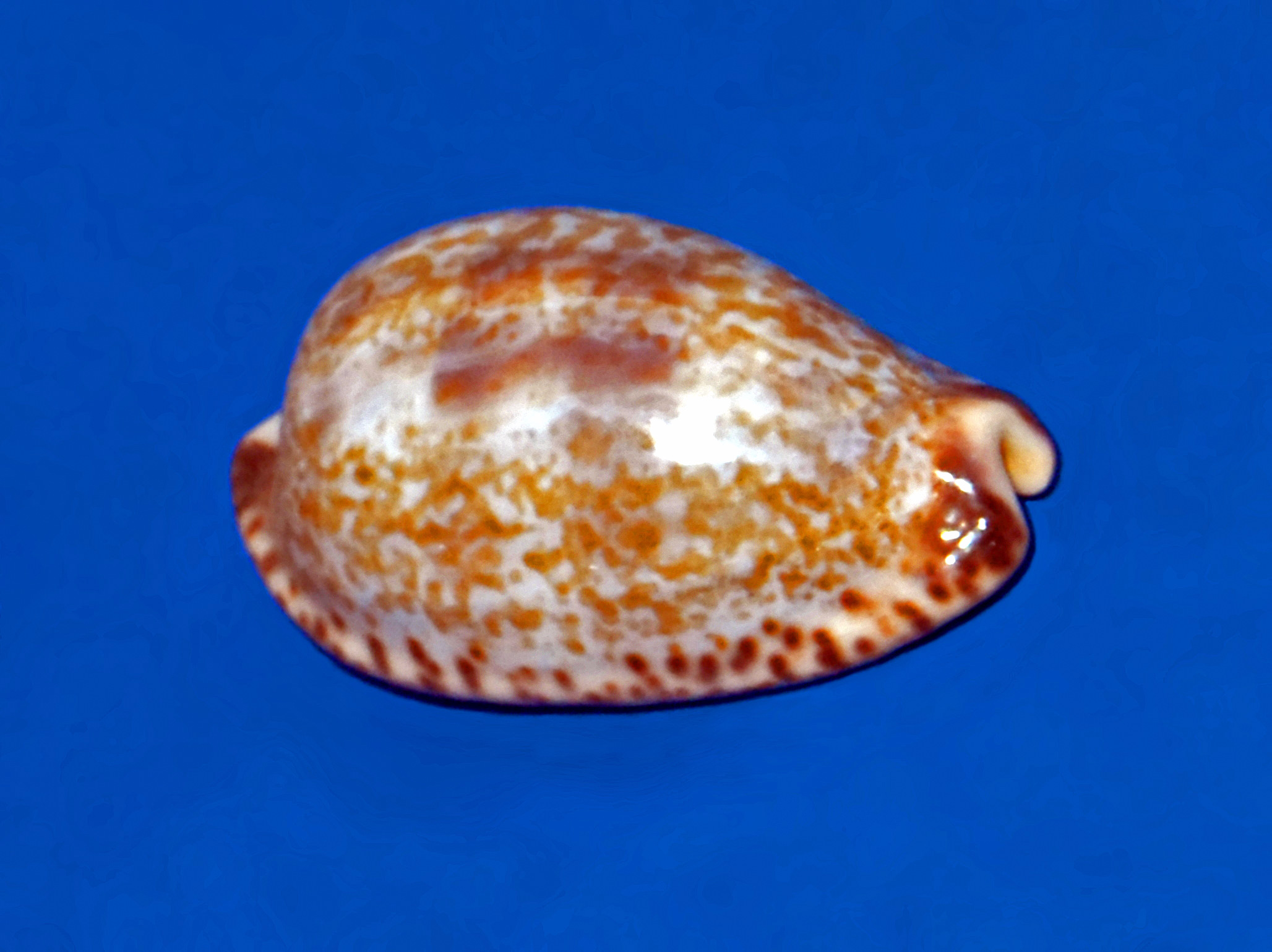
- Shell of Pseudozonaria nigropunctata from Galapagos Islands at the Museo Civico di Storia Naturale di Milano

Scientific classification
- Kingdom: Animalia
- Phylum: Mollusca
- Class: Gastropoda
- Subclass: Caenogastropoda
- Order: Littorinimorpha
- Family: Cypraeidae
- Genus: Pseudozonaria
- Species: P. nigropunctata

Binomial name
- Pseudozonaria nigropunctata Gray, 1828

Synonyms
- Cypraea nigropunctata Gray, 1828

= Pseudozonaria nigropunctata =

Black-spotted cowry

Species of gastropod

Pseudozonaria nigropunctata, common name the black-spotted cowry, is a species of sea snail, a cowry, a marine gastropod mollusk in the family Cypraeidae, the cowries.

== Description ==
Adult shell size varies between 17 mm and 42 mm. The dorsum surface is usually dark brown or greenish, while the base may be pale brown, yellowish or also pinkish, with small dark brown spots on the ventral margin.

== Distribution ==
This species can be found in the Galapagos Islands, Ecuador and in northern Peru.
