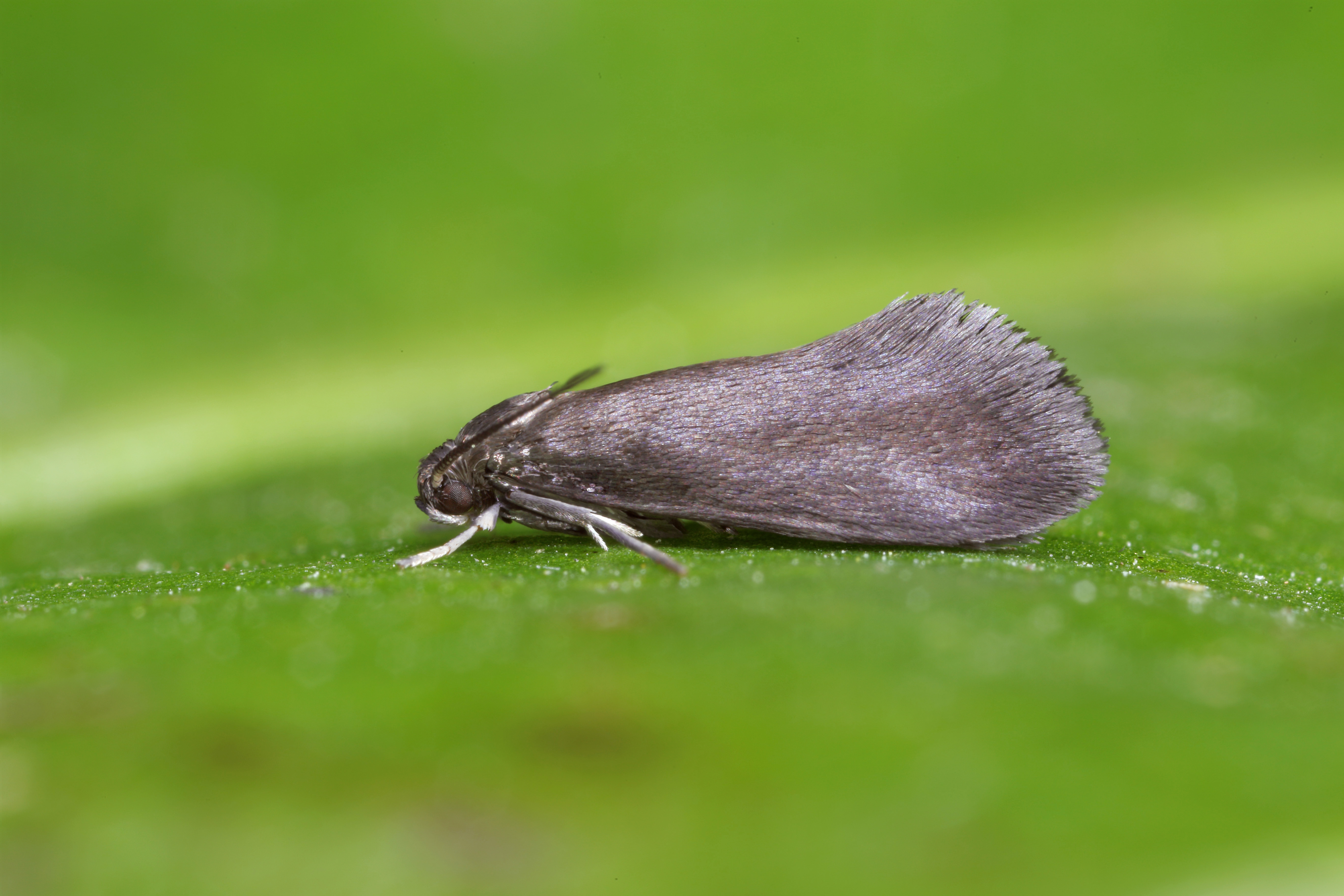

Scientific classification
- Kingdom: Animalia
- Phylum: Arthropoda
- Class: Insecta
- Order: Lepidoptera
- Family: Tineidae
- Genus: Psychoides
- Species: P. verhuella

Binomial name
- Psychoides verhuella Bruand, 1853

= Psychoides verhuella =

Species of moth

Psychoides verhuella is a moth of the family Tineidae found in Europe. It was first described in 1853, by Charles Théophile Bruand d'Uzelle from a specimen from Besançon, France. It is the type species of the genus Psychoides, also raised by Charles Bruand in 1853. The larvae feed on ferns.

== Life cycle ==
=== Larva ===
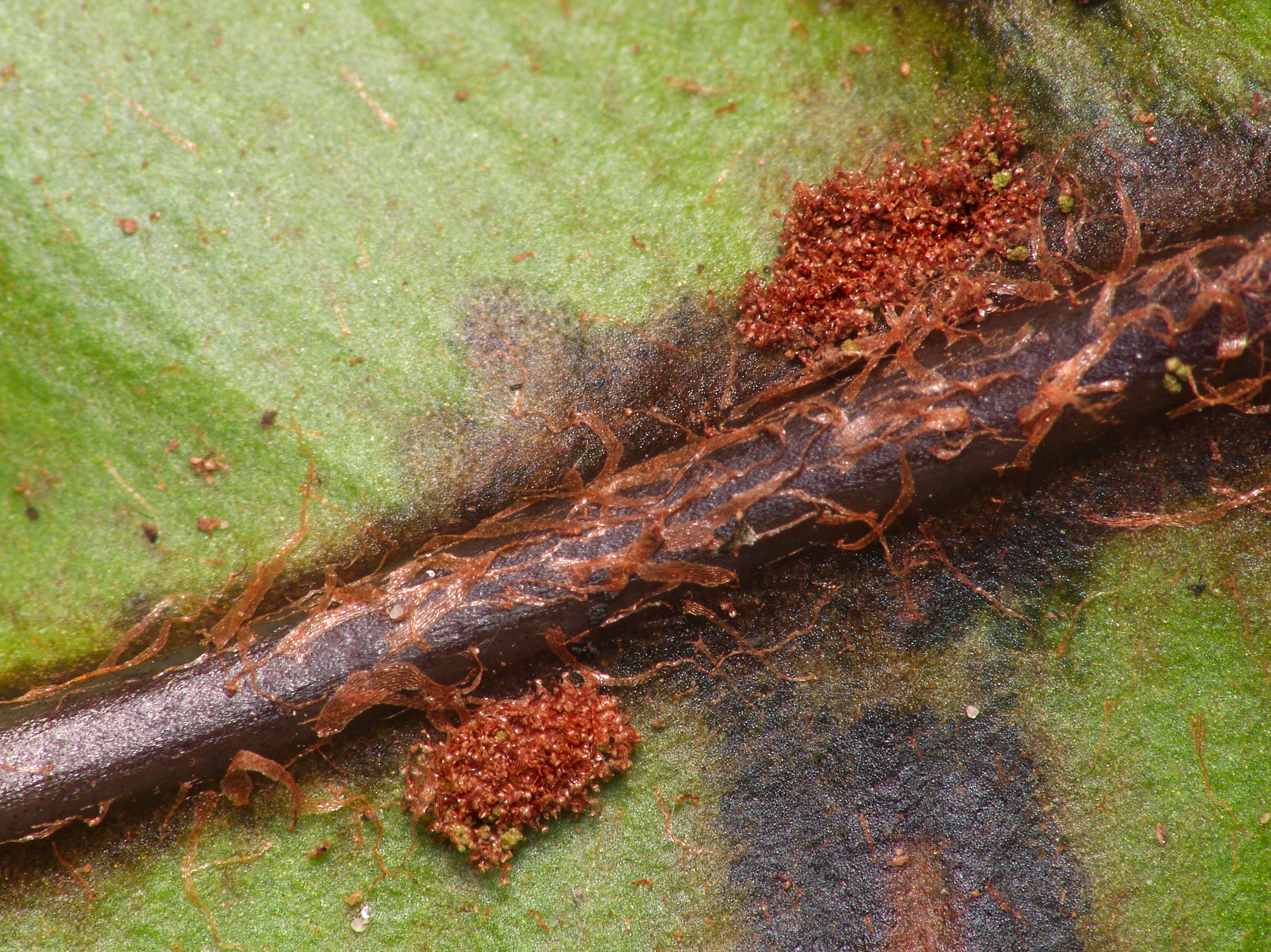

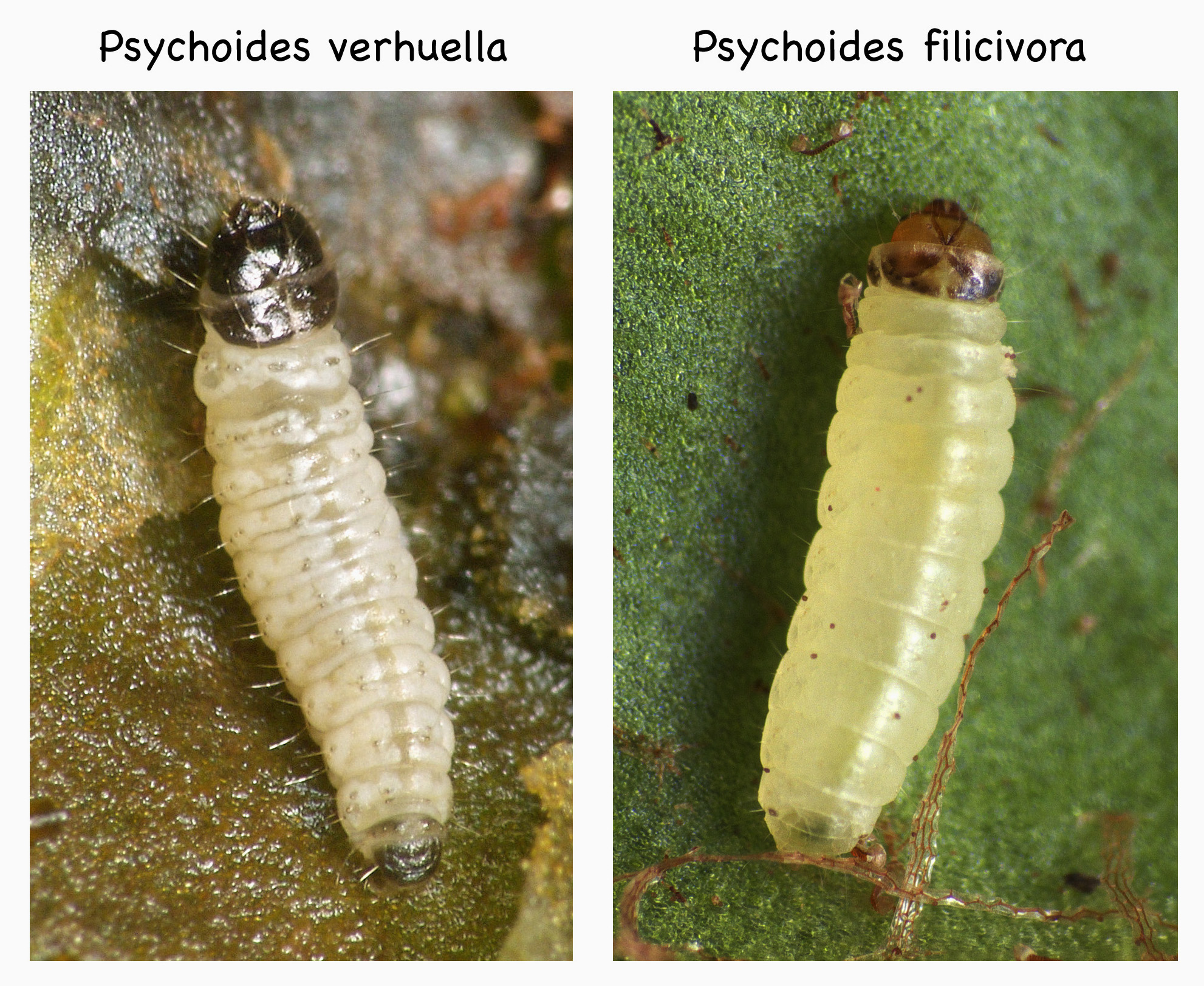

Larvae feed from August to June, initially in a whitish mine in the frond, and in the spring they leave the mine and burrow into a sorus, feeding on the sporangia. They later form a loose, portable case from empty sporangia and when fully grown in May the case resembles a misplaced sorus, especially on hart's-tongue fern (Asplenium scolopendrium). The larva is yellowish white with a brownish dorsa line and has a black head and black prothoracic plate.

The following ferns have been recorded as food plants,

- rustyback (Asplenium ceterach)
- wall-rue (Asplenium ruta-muraria)
- hart's-tongue fern (Asplenium scolopendrium)
- maidenhair spleenwort (Asplenium trichomanes)
- bracken (Pteridium aquilinum)

Larva of another moth, Psychoides filicivora also feed on ferns. It has a pale-brown head and a pale-brown posterial margin, which has a split in the middle, compared with the black head and prothoracic plate of Psychoides verhuella.

=== Pupa ===
In a larval case, which is often against the midrib of the food plant. Can be found in May and June.

=== Imago ===
Single brooded, the moth flies in June and July, in early morning and late afternoon sunshine. Occasionally comes to light. The grey to dark grey monochrome forewings have a violet reflection and lack the white tornal spot of Psychoides filicivora. The antennae are wire-shaped and just over half as long as the front wings.

== Distribution ==
Found in Europe, this species has been recorded from the following countries and regions; Austria, Belgium, Channel Islands, Czech Republic, Germany, Great Britain (local distribution), Hungary, Ireland, Poland and Romania.

== Etymology ==
Psychoides was raised by Charles Braund in 1853 and comes from psukhē – of the soul, i.e. a moth of the family Psychidae and eidos – form, that is from the similarity of this species to moths of the Psychidae. The specific name verhuella is in honour of the mid-19th century Dutch entomologist, Q M R Verhuell.

== Bibliography ==
- Pelham-Clinton, E. C. (1985). "Tiniedae". In Heath, John (ed.). The Moths and Butterflies of Great Britain and Ireland. Vol. 2. Colchester: Harley Books. pp. 152–208. ISBN 0-946589-19-4.
