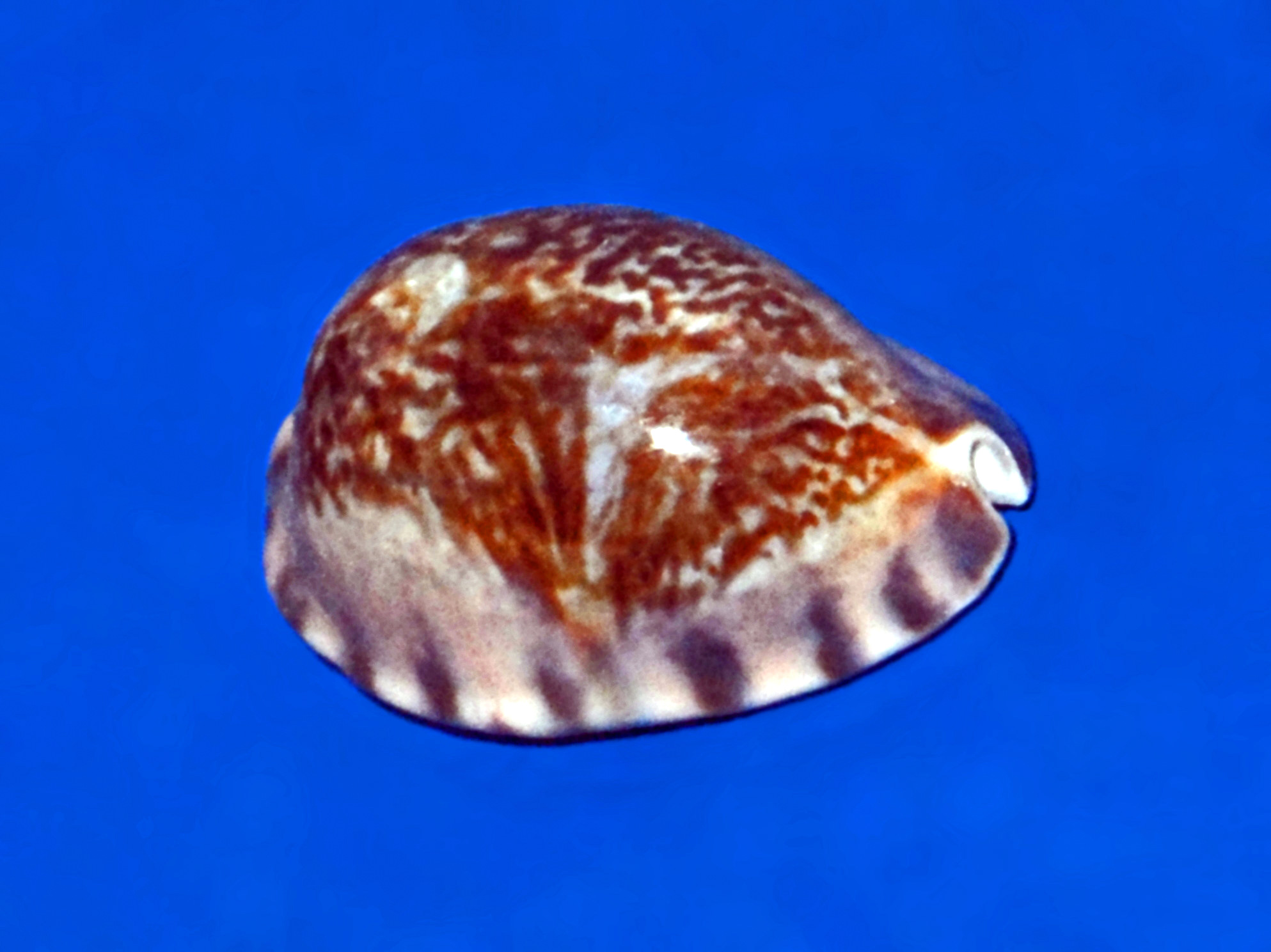
- Shell of Pseudozonaria arabicula from Panama at the Museo Civico di Storia Naturale di Milano

Scientific classification
- Kingdom: Animalia
- Phylum: Mollusca
- Class: Gastropoda
- Subclass: Caenogastropoda
- Order: Littorinimorpha
- Family: Cypraeidae
- Genus: Pseudozonaria
- Species: P. arabicula

Binomial name
- Pseudozonaria arabicula (Lamarck, 1811)

Synonyms
- Cypraea arabicula Lamarck, 1811 (basionym); Cypraea gemmula Weinkauff, 1881

= Pseudozonaria arabicula =

Species of gastropod

Pseudozonaria arabicula, common name : the little Arabian cowry, is a species of sea snail, a cowry, a marine gastropod mollusk in the family Cypraeidae, the cowries.

== Description ==
The shell size varies between 13 mm and 37 mm. The dorsum surface is usually dark brown or greyish, while the base is whitish or pale brown, with large dark brown or blackish spots on the ventral margin.

== Distribution ==
This species occurs in the Pacific Ocean along the Galapagos Islands and from Baja California to Peru. A record of this species from Kenya likely stems from a confusion with Mauritia arabica (syn. Cypraea arabica).
