= Psychoides gosari =

Scientific classification
- Kingdom: Animalia
- Phylum: Arthropoda
- Class: Insecta
- Order: Lepidoptera
- Family: Tineidae
- Genus: Psychoides
- Species: P. gosari

Binomial name
- Psychoides gosari Kim & Bae, 2007

Species of moth

Psychoides gosari is a moth of the family Tineidae first described by Seok Kim and Yang-Seop Bae in 2007 from pupae collected from Mount Hwaya in Gyeonggi Province. It is endemic to South Korea.

== Nomenclature ==
The specific name is derived from gosari, the Korean name for its host plants.

== Ecology ==
The moth is found in fern communities, within forested areas in mountain passes. The larvae feed on the sporangia or fronds of the following species,

- Athyrium yokoscense
- Dryopteris bissetiana
- Dryopteris chinensis
- Dryopteris crassirhizoma
- Dryopteris saxifraga

Pupae were collected from the lower surface of a frond of Dryopteris in Mount Hwaya, Gyeonggi Provence, emerging as adults in a laboratory.
