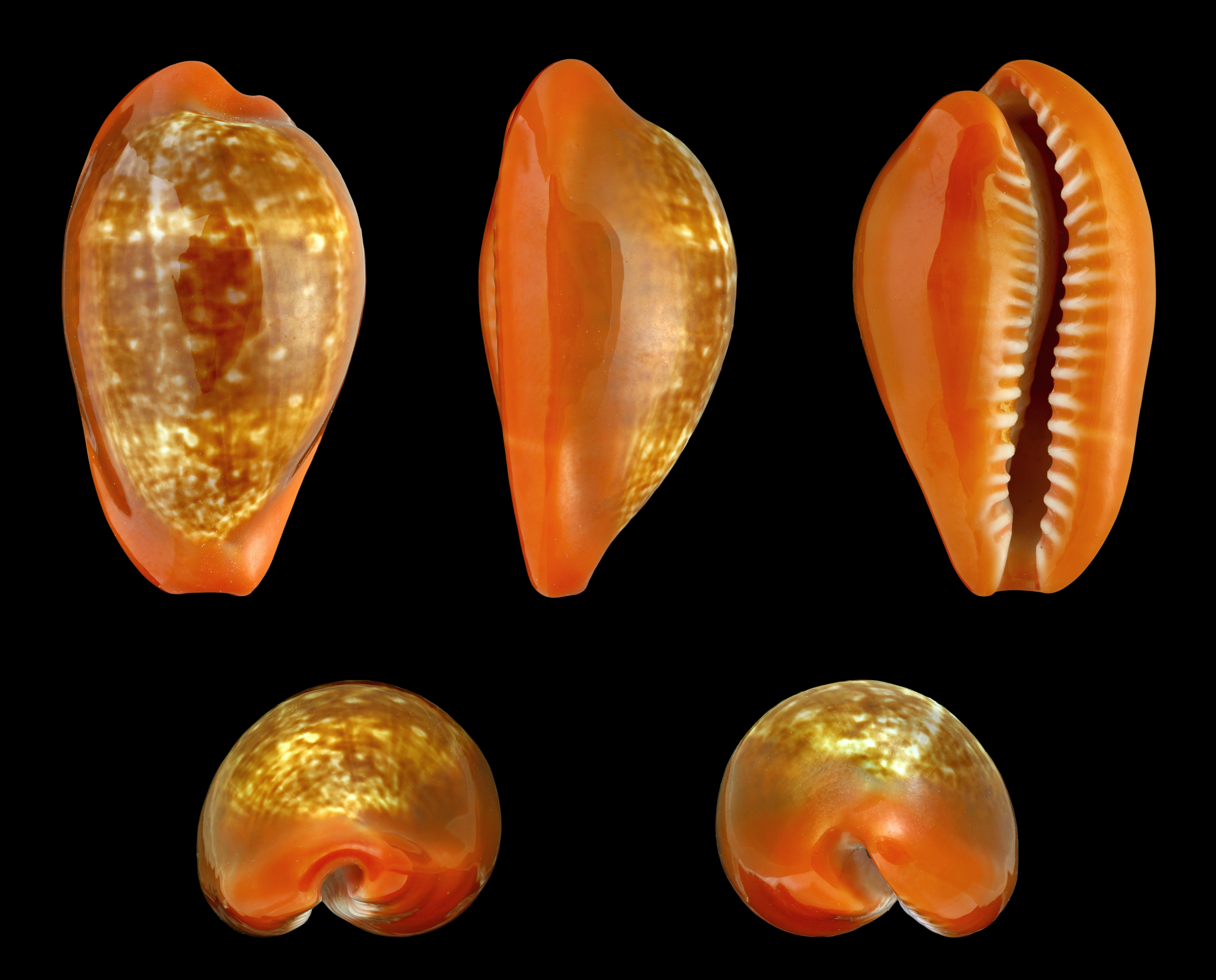
- A shell of Zonaria pyrum

Scientific classification
- Kingdom: Animalia
- Phylum: Mollusca
- Class: Gastropoda
- Subclass: Caenogastropoda
- Order: Littorinimorpha
- Family: Cypraeidae
- Genus: Zonaria
- Species: Z. pyrum

Binomial name
- Zonaria pyrum (Gmelin, 1791)

Synonyms
- Cypraea bifasciata Monterosato, 1897; Cypraea guttata Risso, 1826 ·; Cypraea pyrum Gmelin, 1791 (basionym); Cypraea pirum var. physoides Coen, 1933 ·; Cypraea pyrum var. aurantia (Coen, 1949); Cypraea pyrum var. compressa (Coen, 1949); Cypraea pyrum var. cruenta (Coen, 1949) ·; Cypraea pyrum var. elongata (Coen, 1949) ·; Cypraea pyrum var. grandis Monterosato, 1898 junior subjective synonym; Cypraea pyrum var. minor Monterosato, 1898 junior subjective synonym; Cypraea pyrum var. nivosa (Coen, 1949); Cypraea pyrum var. normalis Monterosato, 1898 junior subjective synonym; Cypraea pyrum var. pallida Pallary, 1900; Cypraea pyrum var. typica Monterosato, 1898 junior subjective synonym; Zonaria pyrum var. aurantia Coen, 1949 ·; Zonaria pyrum var. compressa Coen, 1949 ·; Zonaria pyrum var. confusa Coen, 1949 ·; Zonaria pyrum var. cruenta Coen, 1949 ·; Zonaria pyrum var. elongata Coen, 1949 ·; Zonaria pyrum var. hepatica Coen, 1949 ·; Zonaria pyrum var. minima Coen, 1949 ·; Zonaria pyrum var. nivosa Coen, 1949 ·; Zonaria pyrum var. piperitoides Coen, 1949

= Zonaria pyrum =

Species of gastropod

Zonaria pyrum, common name the pear cowry, is a species of sea snail, a cowry, a marine gastropod mollusc in the family Cypraeidae, the cowries.

Subspecies

- Zonaria pyrum insularum F. A. Schilder, 1928
- Zonaria pyrum pyrum (Gmelin, 1791)

== Description ==
The shells of these quite common cowries reach on average 32–38 millimetres (1.3–1.5 in) of length, with a minimum size of 17 millimetres (0.67 in) and a maximum size of 52 millimetres (2.0 in).

== Description ==
They are very variable in pattern and colour. The surface is smooth and shiny, their basic color is usually orange-brown, with many brown spots and two or three clear trasversal bands. The base, the margins and the teeth are orange or pinkish. In the living cowries mantle and foot are quite developed, with external antennae. The mantle is orange-reddish, with yellow papillae. The lateral flaps may hide completely the shell surface and may be quickly retracted into the shell opening.

== Distribution ==
This species occurs in the Mediterranean Sea to southwest Africa, off Morocco, Tunisia, Libya, Italy, Lampedusa Island, Sicily, Malta, Greece, Turkey, Senegal, Gabon and Angola.

== Habitat ==
These cowries live in tropical and subtropical waters usually up to 15–50 metres (49–164 ft) of depth, hidden under rocks or coral slabs and caves. They are omnivore-grazer, mainly feeding at night on sponges, algae and corals.
