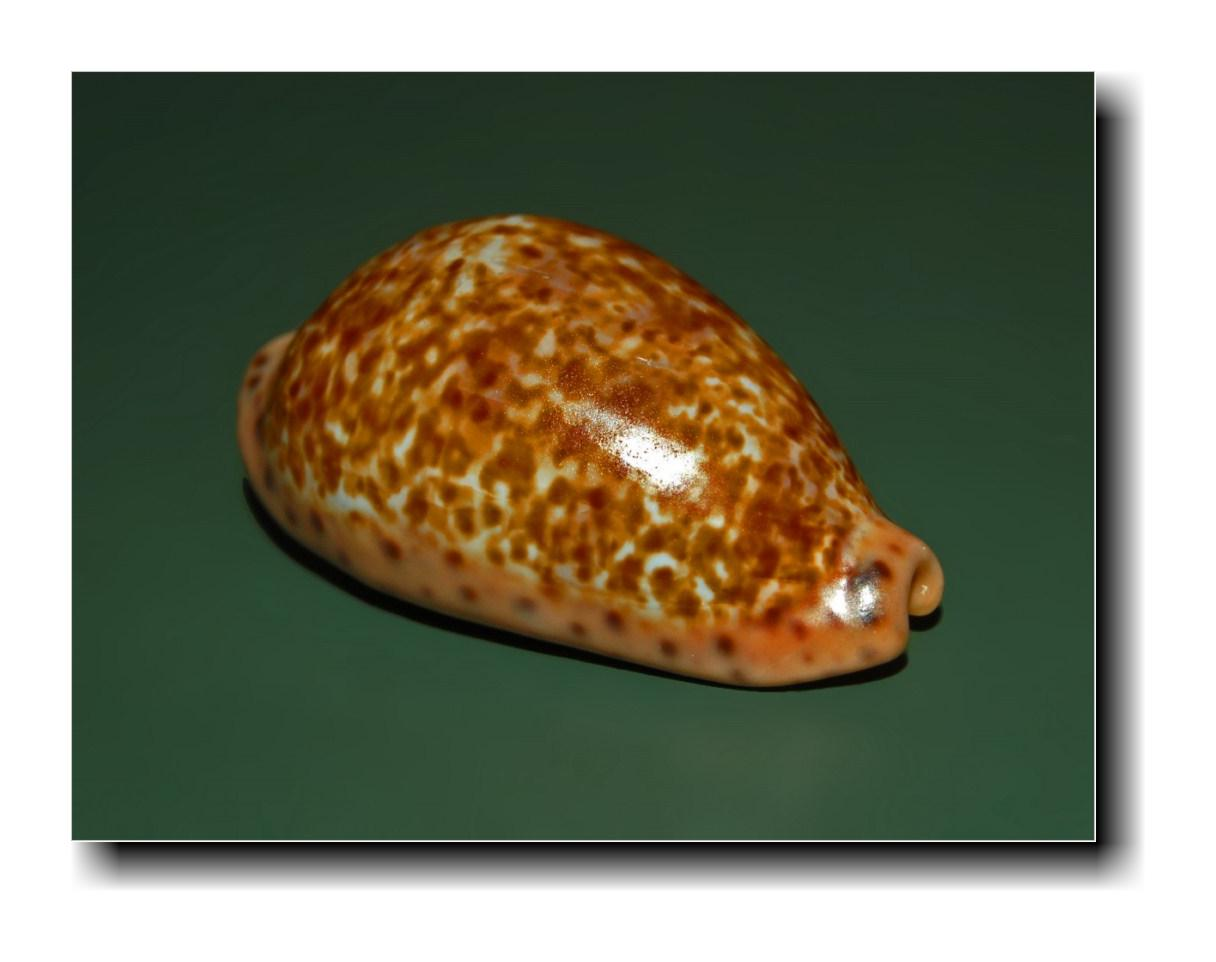
- A shell of Pseudozonaria annettae from Nicaragua, anterior end towards the right

Scientific classification
- Kingdom: Animalia
- Phylum: Mollusca
- Class: Gastropoda
- Subclass: Caenogastropoda
- Order: Littorinimorpha
- Family: Cypraeidae
- Genus: Pseudozonaria
- Species: P. annettae

Binomial name
- Pseudozonaria annettae Dall, 1909

Synonyms
- Cypraea annettae Dall, 1909

= Pseudozonaria annettae =

Species of gastropod

Pseudozonaria annettae is a species of sea snail, a cowry, a marine gastropod mollusk in the family Cypraeidae, the cowries.

== Description ==
The shell of this species reaches 20–50 millimetres (0.79–1.97 in) of length.

== Distribution and habitat ==
This species and its subspecies are found in the Gulf of California and in the seas along Western Mexico and Peru. They can be found under rocks in 8–10 meters of water.

== Subspecies ==
- Pseudozonaria annettae aequinoctialis Schilder, 1933
- Pseudozonaria annettae annettae Dall, 1909
