= Notadusta =

Scientific classification
- Kingdom: Animalia
- Phylum: Mollusca
- Class: Gastropoda
- Subclass: Caenogastropoda
- Order: Littorinimorpha
- Superfamily: Cypraeoidea
- Family: Cypraeidae
- Genus: †Notadusta; Schilder, 1935

Type species
- † Cypraea victoriana Schilder, 1935

Genus of gastropods

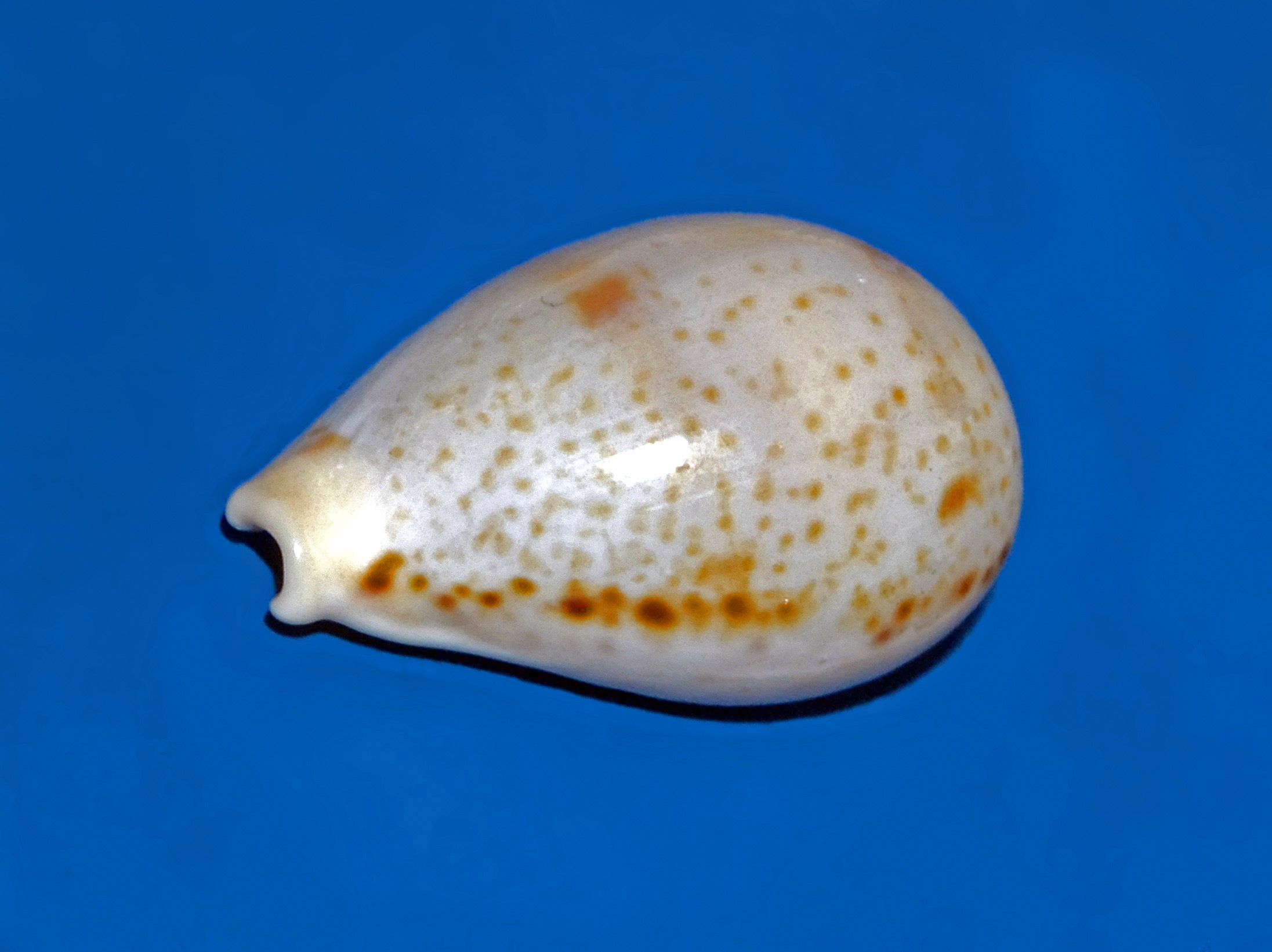
Shell of Notadusta hungerfordi at the Museo Civico di Storia Naturale di Milano

Notadusta is an extinct genus of sea snails, marine gastropod mollusks in the family Cypraeidae, the cowries.

== Species ==
Species within the genus Notadusta include:

- † Notadusta clifdenensis Cernohorsky, 1971
- † Notadusta egregia Schilder, 1937
- † Notadusta spolongensis Schilder, 1937
- † Notadusta trelissickensis (Suter, 1917)
- † Notadusta victoriana (Schilder, 1935)

Species brought into synonymy

- Notadusta boucheti Lorenz, 2002: synonym of Palmulacypraea boucheti (Lorenz, 2002)
- Notadusta hartsmithi Schilder, 1967 : synonym of Notocypraea dissecta Iredale, 1931
- Notadusta hungerfordi (Sowerby III, 1888): synonym of Paradusta hungerfordi (G. B. Sowerby III, 1888)
- Notadusta katsuae: synonym of Palmulacypraea katsuae (Kuroda, 1960)
- Notadusta martini (Schepman, 1907): synonym of Ransoniella martini (Schepman, 1907)
- Notadusta omii Ikeda, 1998: synonym of Palmulacypraea omii (Ikeda, 1998)
- Notadusta punctata (Linnaeus, 1771): synonym of Ransoniella punctata (Linnaeus, 1771)
