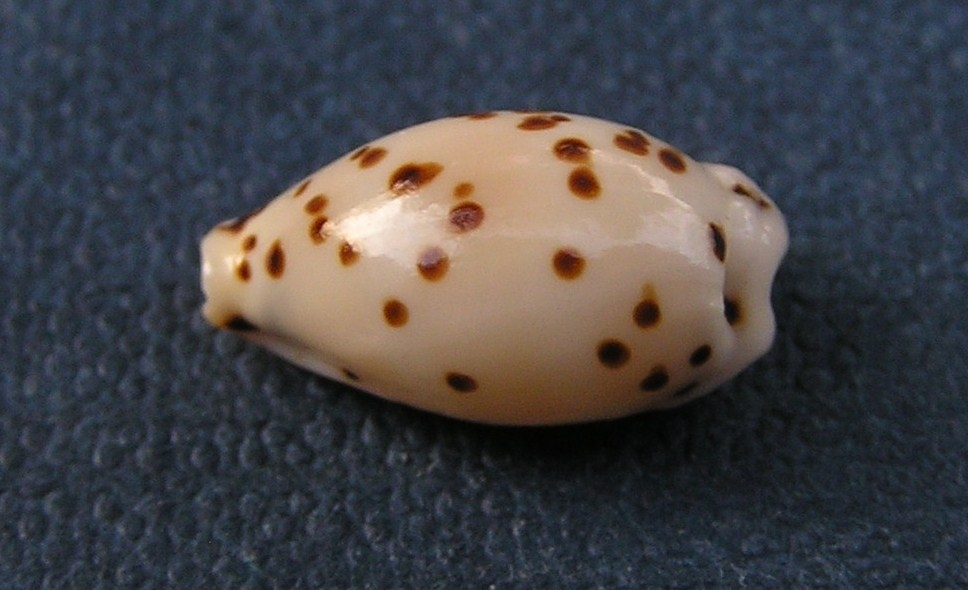
- Ransoniella glandina

Scientific classification
- Kingdom: Animalia
- Phylum: Mollusca
- Class: Gastropoda
- Subclass: Caenogastropoda
- Order: Littorinimorpha
- Superfamily: Cypraeoidea
- Family: Cypraeidae
- Genus: Ransoniella; Dolin & Lozouet, 2005

Synonyms
- Ransonia Dolin & Lozouet, 2004 (Invalid: junior homonym of Ransonia Blandin, 1979 [Arachnida]; Ransoniella is a replacement name)

= Ransoniella =

Genus of gastropods

Ransoniella is a genus of sea snails, marine gastropod mollusks in the subfamily Erroneinae of the family Cypraeidae, the cowries. Most species in this genus have become a synonym of species in Notadusta Schilder, 1935

== Taxonomy ==
The taxonomy of Ransoniella proposed by Dolin (2007) is controversial. However, as it has not been refuted in print, it was followed here in WoRMS. Ideally, Dolin's species will have to be tested by molecular characters.

== Species ==
The following species within the genus Ransoniella have become synonym with Notadusta punctata (Linnaeus, 1771) :

- † Ransonia antistita Dolin & Lozouet, 2004
- Ransoniella coseli (Dolin & Lozouet, 2004)
- † Ransoniella faviai (Dolin & Lozouet, 2004) †
- † Ransoniella ferruginosa (Dolin & Lozouet, 2004) †
- † Ransoniella girardae (Dolin & Lozouet, 2004) †
- † Ransoniella gofasi (Dolin & Lozouet, 2004) †
- † Ransoniella inhereditaria (Dolin & Lozouet, 2004) †
- Ransoniella martini (Schepman, 1907)
- † Ransoniella minuscula (Dolin & Lozouet, 2004) †
- † Ransoniella pouyensis (Dolin & Lozouet, 2004) †
- † Ransoniella pseudohirundo (d'Orbigny, 1852) †
- Ransoniella punctata (Linnaeus, 1771)
- † Ransoniella senuti (Dolin & Lozouet, 2004) †
- † Ransoniella tarbelliana (Dolin & Lozouet, 2004) †

Species brought into synonymy

- Ransoniella atomaria (Gmelin, 1791): synonym of Notadusta punctata (Linnaeus, 1771): synonym of Ransoniella punctata ([[Carl Linnaeus|Linnaeus]], 1771)
- Ransoniella bulbosa Dolin, 2007: synonym of Notadusta punctata (Linnaeus, 1771): synonym of Ransoniella punctata (Linnaeus, 1771)
- Ransoniella carula (Iredale, 1939): synonym of Notadusta punctata (Linnaeus, 1771): synonym of Ransoniella punctata (Linnaeus, 1771)
- Ransoniella erminea Dolin, 2007: synonym of Notadusta punctata (Linnaeus, 1771): synonym of Ransoniella punctata (Linnaeus, 1771)
- Ransoniella fusula Dolin, 2007: synonym of Notadusta punctata (Linnaeus, 1771): synonym of Ransoniella punctata (Linnaeus, 1771)
- Ransoniella glandina Dolin, 2007: synonym of Notadusta punctata (Linnaeus, 1771): synonym of Ransoniella punctata (Linnaeus, 1771)
- Ransoniella iredalei (Schilder & Schilder, 1938): synonym of Notadusta punctata (Linnaeus, 1771): synonym of Ransoniella punctata (Linnaeus, 1771)
- Ransoniella labiosa Dolin, 2007: synonym of Notadusta punctata (Linnaeus, 1771): synonym of Ransoniella punctata (Linnaeus, 1771)
- Ransoniella meyeri Dolin, 2007: synonym of Notadusta punctata (Linnaeus, 1771): synonym of Ransoniella punctata (Linnaeus, 1771)
- Ransoniella oryza Dolin, 2007: synonym of Notadusta punctata (Linnaeus, 1771): synonym of Ransoniella punctata (Linnaeus, 1771)
- Ransoniella persticta (Iredale, 1939): synonym of Notadusta punctata (Linnaeus, 1771): synonym of Ransoniella punctata (Linnaeus, 1771)
- Ransoniella radiosa Dolin, 2007: synonym of Notadusta punctata (Linnaeus, 1771): synonym of Ransoniella punctata (Linnaeus, 1771)
- Ransoniella serrata Dolin, 2007: synonym of Notadusta punctata (Linnaeus, 1771): synonym of Ransoniella punctata (Linnaeus, 1771)
- Ransoniella uvula Dolin, 2007: synonym of Notadusta punctata (Linnaeus, 1771): synonym of Ransoniella punctata (Linnaeus, 1771)
- Ransoniella vulgata Dolin, 2007: synonym of Notadusta punctata (Linnaeus, 1771): synonym of Ransoniella punctata (Linnaeus, 1771)
- Ransoniella zyzypha Dolin, 2007: synonym of Notadusta punctata (Linnaeus, 1771): synonym of Ransoniella punctata (Linnaeus, 1771)
