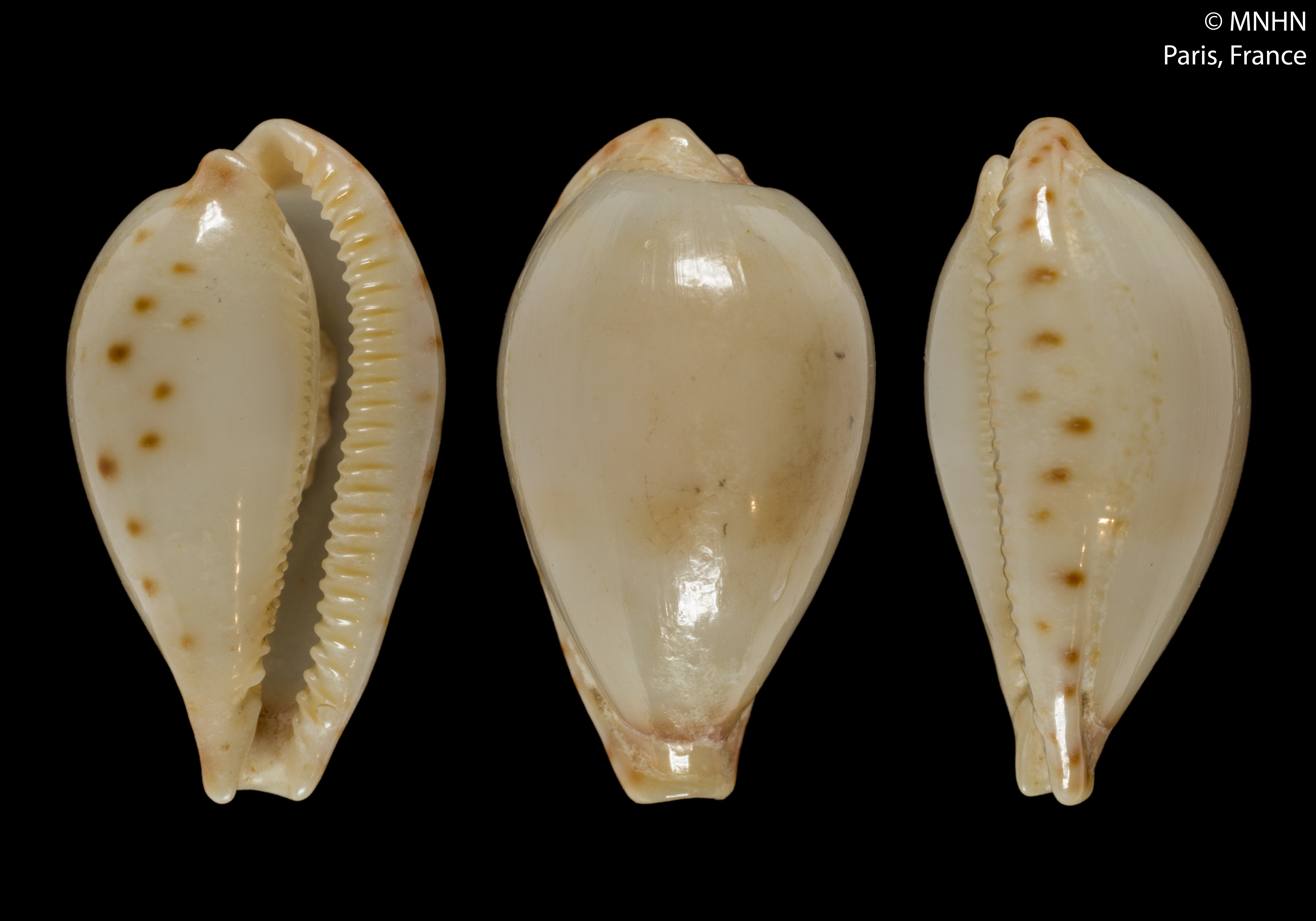
- Shell of Palmulacypraea boucheti (holotype at MNHN, Paris)

Scientific classification
- Kingdom: Animalia
- Phylum: Mollusca
- Class: Gastropoda
- Subclass: Caenogastropoda
- Order: Littorinimorpha
- Family: Cypraeidae
- Genus: Palmulacypraea; Meyer, 2003

= Palmulacypraea =

Genus of gastropods

Palmulacypraea is a genus of sea snails, marine gastropod molluscs in the family Cypraeidae, the cowries

== Species ==
Species within the genus Austrasiatica include:

- Palmulacypraea boucheti (Lorenz, 2002)
- Palmulacypraea katsuae (Kuroda, 1960)
- Palmulacypraea musumea (Kuroda and Habe, 1961)
- Palmulacypraea omii (Ikeda, 1998)
