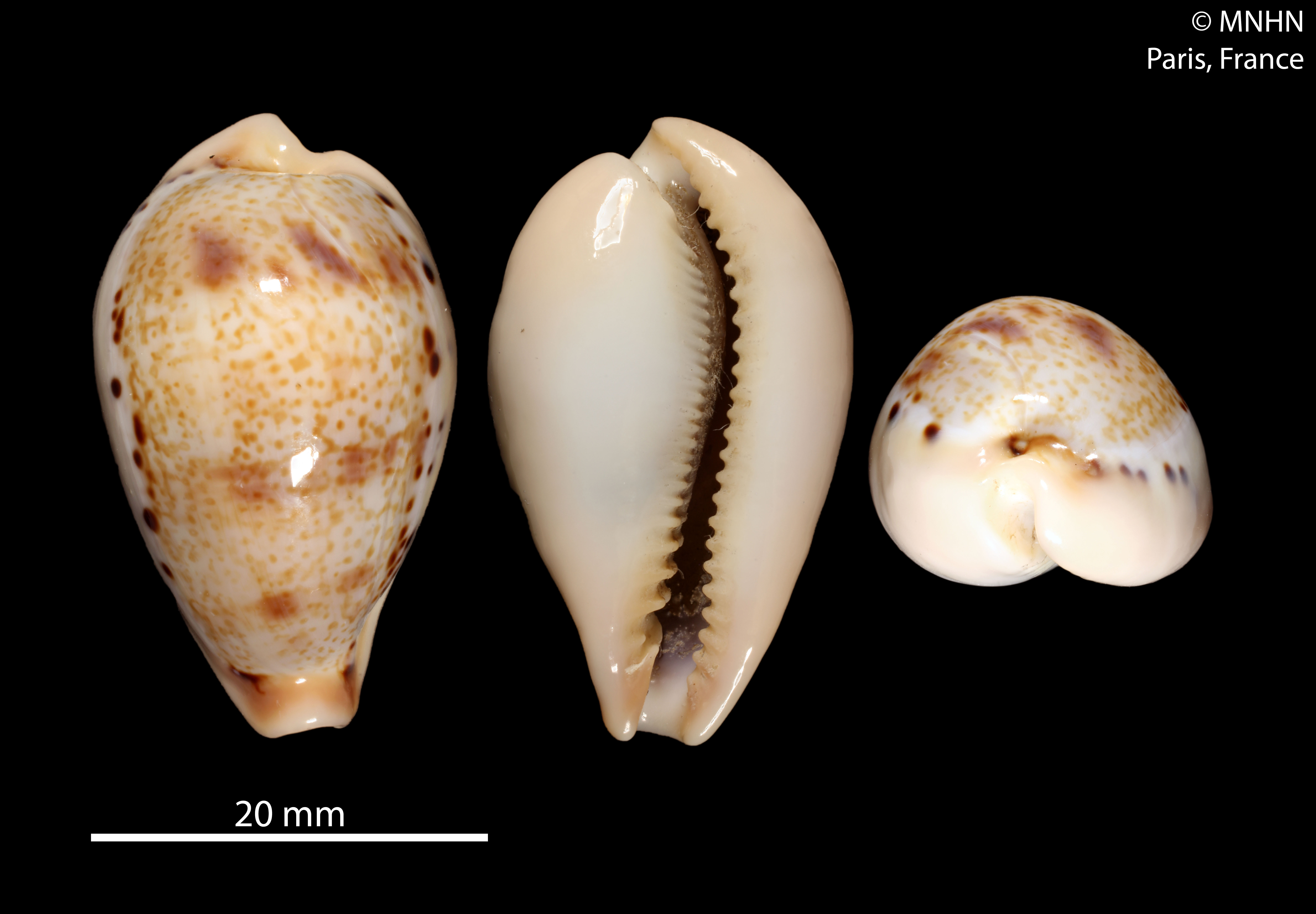
- Shell of Paradusta hungerfordi bealsi (paratype at MNHN, Paris)

Scientific classification
- Kingdom: Animalia
- Phylum: Mollusca
- Class: Gastropoda
- Subclass: Caenogastropoda
- Order: Littorinimorpha
- Superfamily: Cypraeoidea
- Family: Cypraeidae
- Genus: Paradusta; Lorenz, 2017

= Paradusta =

Genus of gastropods

Paradusta is a genus of sea snails, marine gastropod mollusks in the family Cypraeidae, the cowries.

== Species ==
- Paradusta barclayi (Reeve, 1857)
- Paradusta hungerfordi (G. B. Sowerby III, 1888)
