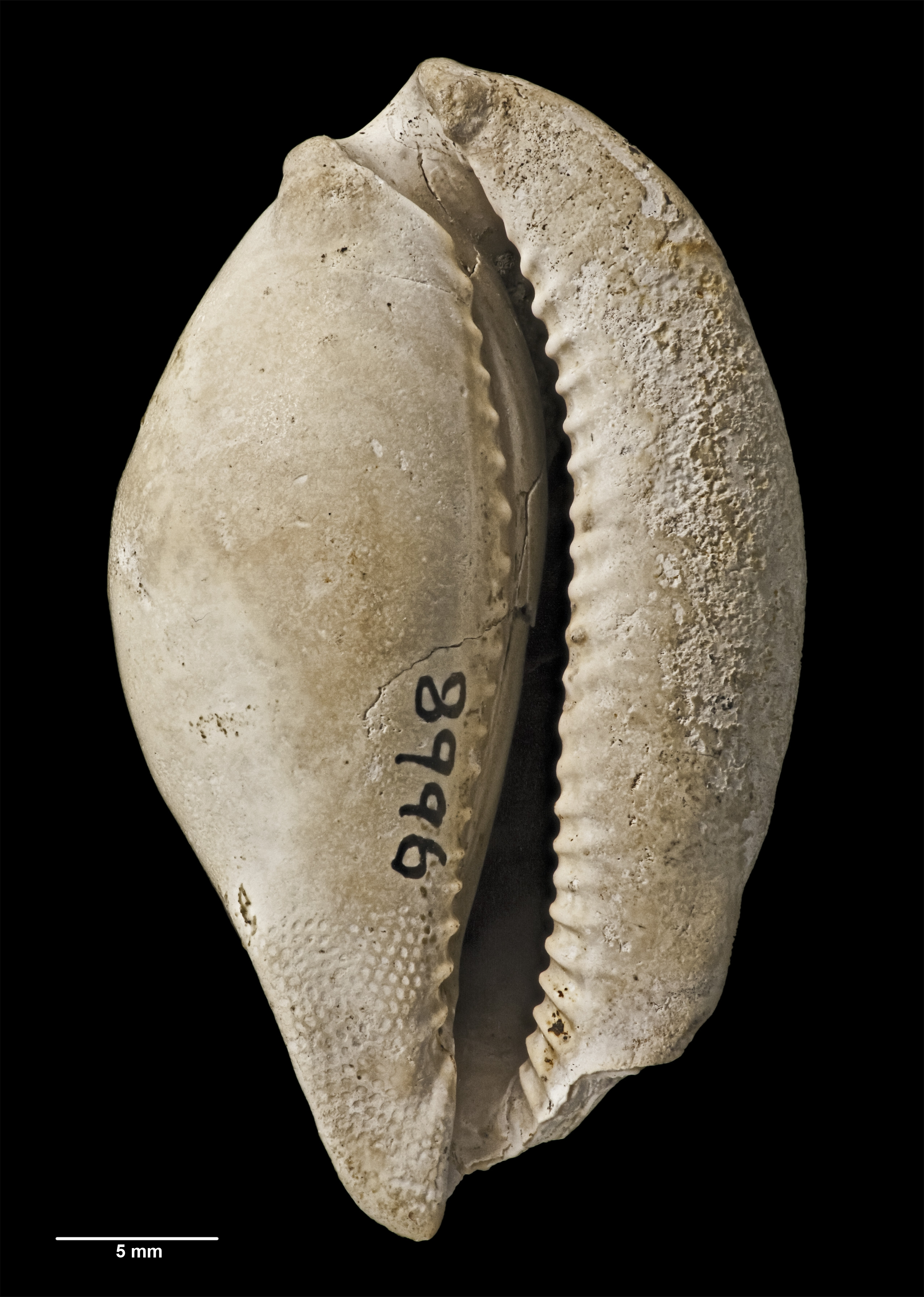
- Holotype from the Auckland War Memorial Museum

Scientific classification
- Kingdom: Animalia
- Phylum: Mollusca
- Class: Gastropoda
- Subclass: Caenogastropoda
- Order: Littorinimorpha
- Superfamily: Cypraeoidea
- Family: Cypraeidae
- Genus: †Notadusta
- Species: †N. clifdenensis

Binomial name
- †Notadusta clifdenensis (Cernohorsky, 1971) †

Synonyms
- Cypraea (Notadusta) clifdenensis (Cernohorsky, 1971); Cypraea clifdenensis (Cernohorsky, 1971); Notoluponia clifdenensis Cernohorsky, 1971; Notoluponia (Notadusta) clifdenensis Cernohorsky, 1971

= Notadusta clifdenensis =

Notadusta clifdenensis Temporal range: early Miocene–late Miocene

Extinct species of gastropod

Notadusta clifdenensis is an extinct species of sea snail, a marine gastropod mollusc, in the family Cypraeidae. Dating to the Miocene, it is the most widespread Cypraeidae fossil in New Zealand.

== Description ==
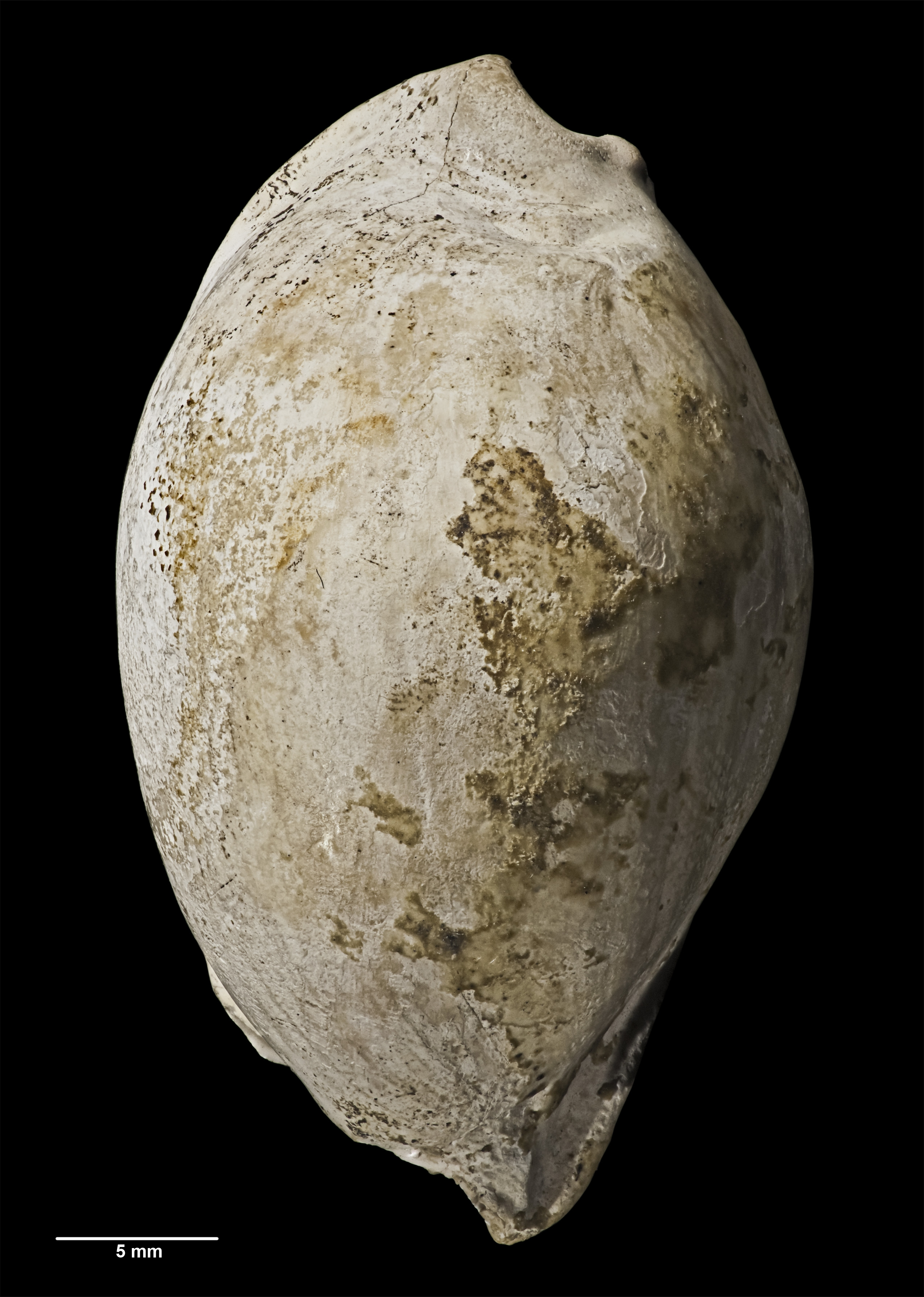
Reverse view of holotype

In the original description, Cernohorsky described the species as follows:

Shell moderate in size, 30–37 mm (1.2–1.5 in) in length, elongate-ovate, sub-cylindrical, dorsum smooth: the labial lip margined, particularly at the extremities, and the columellar lip margined from the centre towards the anterior extremity. Aperture narrow, slightly recurved posteriorly, labial lip declivious anteriorly; the first five anterior teeth slightly produced but not reaching the margin, remainder of teeth short, columellar teeth small and confined to the aperture without extending over the columella. Posterior canal deep and well defined, columella smooth, fossula moderately broad, steep, smooth and not projecting; a single terminal ridge borders the anterior outlet, spire distinct and slightly projecting.

The holotype of the species measures 37 mm (1.5 in) in length, 21 mm (0.83 in) in width, 19 mm (0.75 in) in height. The spire is covered by a callus and is barely recognisable on most fossils, except due to a shallow groove at the base.

It can be differentiated from N. trelissickensis due to being larger, more solid and not pyriform, and from N. victoriana due to being larger and having a steeper, smooth fossula.

== Taxonomy ==
The species was first described by Walter Oliver Cernohorsky in 1971, who used the name Notoluponia (Notadusta) clifdenensis. Cernohorsky retained Harold Finlay's proposed name clifdenensis, which was unpublished but used to identify specimens in his collection. In 2009, A.G. Beu and J.I. Raine recombined the species to Cypraea (Notadusta) clifdenensis. In the same year, the species was listed as Notadusta clifdenensis in the New Zealand Inventory of Biodiversity, which has remained the species' accepted name.

The holotype was sourced from the collections of Harold Finlay, and was collected from Long Beach Shellbed, Clifden, Southland at an unknown date prior to 1970. The holotype is held by the Auckland War Memorial Museum.

== Distribution and habitat ==
This extinct marine species occurs in fossil beds of New Zealand, from Early Miocene Otaian stage to the Late Miocene Kapitean stage. It is the most widespread fossil member of Cypraeidae, and has been found in areas including Clifden, the Kaipara Harbour, Parengarenga Harbour, Pāhaoa River and East Cape.
