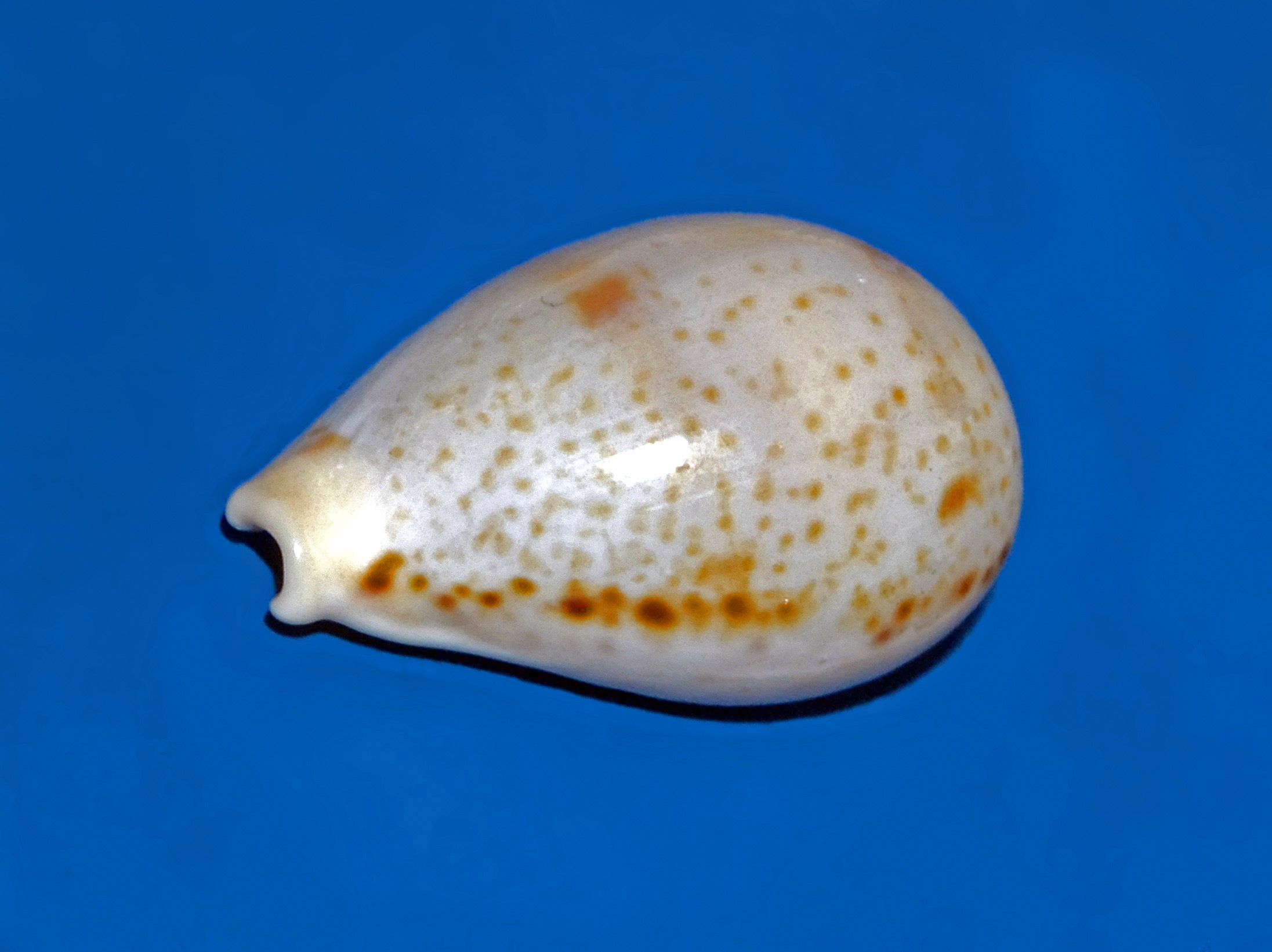
- Shell of Paradusta hungerfordi from Japan at the Museo Civico di Storia Naturale di Milano

Scientific classification
- Kingdom: Animalia
- Phylum: Mollusca
- Class: Gastropoda
- Subclass: Caenogastropoda
- Order: Littorinimorpha
- Family: Cypraeidae
- Genus: Paradusta
- Species: P. hungerfordi

Binomial name
- Paradusta hungerfordi (Sowerby III, 1888)

Synonyms
- Cypraea hungerfordi G. B. Sowerby III, 1888 (original combination); Erronea hungerfordi (G.B. Sowerby III, 1888); Notadusta hungerfordi (G. B. Sowerby III, 1888)

= Paradusta hungerfordi =

Species of gastropod

Paradusta hungerfordi, common name Hungerford's cowry, is a species of sea snails, marine gastropod mollusks in the family Cypraeidae, the cowries.

== Description ==
Paradusta hungerfordi has a pear-shaped shell reaching a size of 20 – 48 mm, with a quite variable coloration and pattern. Usually the dorsum surface is pale brown or whitish with brown dots, while the ventral surface may be whitish, yellowish or also orange.

== Distribution ==
This species can be found around Japan and in the northeastern coast of Australia.

== Subspecies ==
- Paradusta hungerfordi bealsi (Mock, 1996)
- Paradusta hungerfordi coucoumi (Schilder, 1964)
- Paradusta hungerfordi hungerfordi (Sowerby III, 1888)
- Paradusta hungerfordi lovetha (Poppe, Tagaro & Buijse, 2005)

== Gallery ==
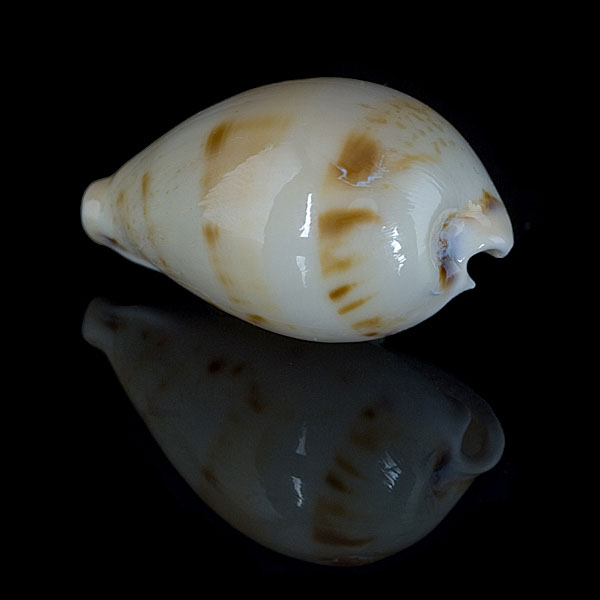
Shell of Paradusta hungerfordi coucomi

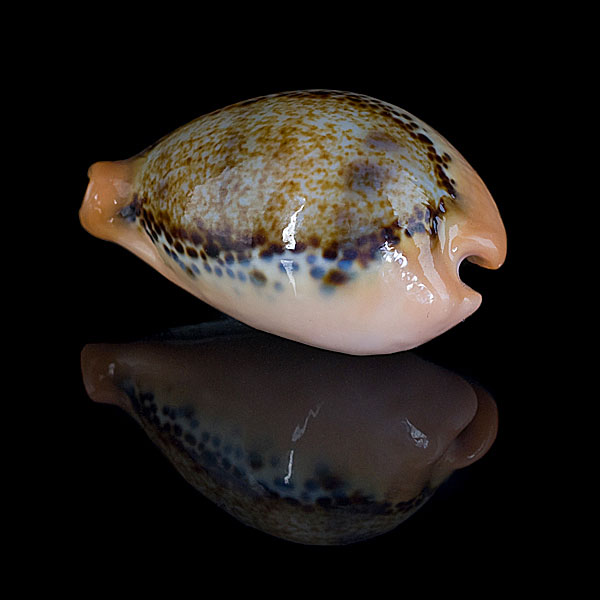
Shell of Paradusta hungerfordi hungerfordi

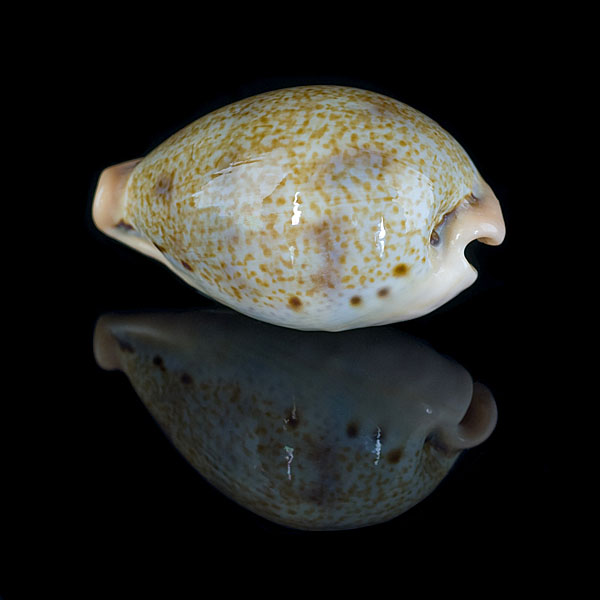
Shell of Paradusta hungerfordi bealsi
