= Palmulacypraea omii =

Scientific classification
- Kingdom: Animalia
- Phylum: Mollusca
- Class: Gastropoda
- Subclass: Caenogastropoda
- Order: Littorinimorpha
- Family: Cypraeidae
- Genus: Palmulacypraea
- Species: P. omii

Binomial name
- Palmulacypraea omii (Ikeda, 1998)

Synonyms
- Notadusta omii Ikeda, 1998 (basionym)

Species of gastropod

Palmulacypraea omii is a species of sea snail, a cowry, a marine gastropod mollusc in the family Cypraeidae, the cowries.
