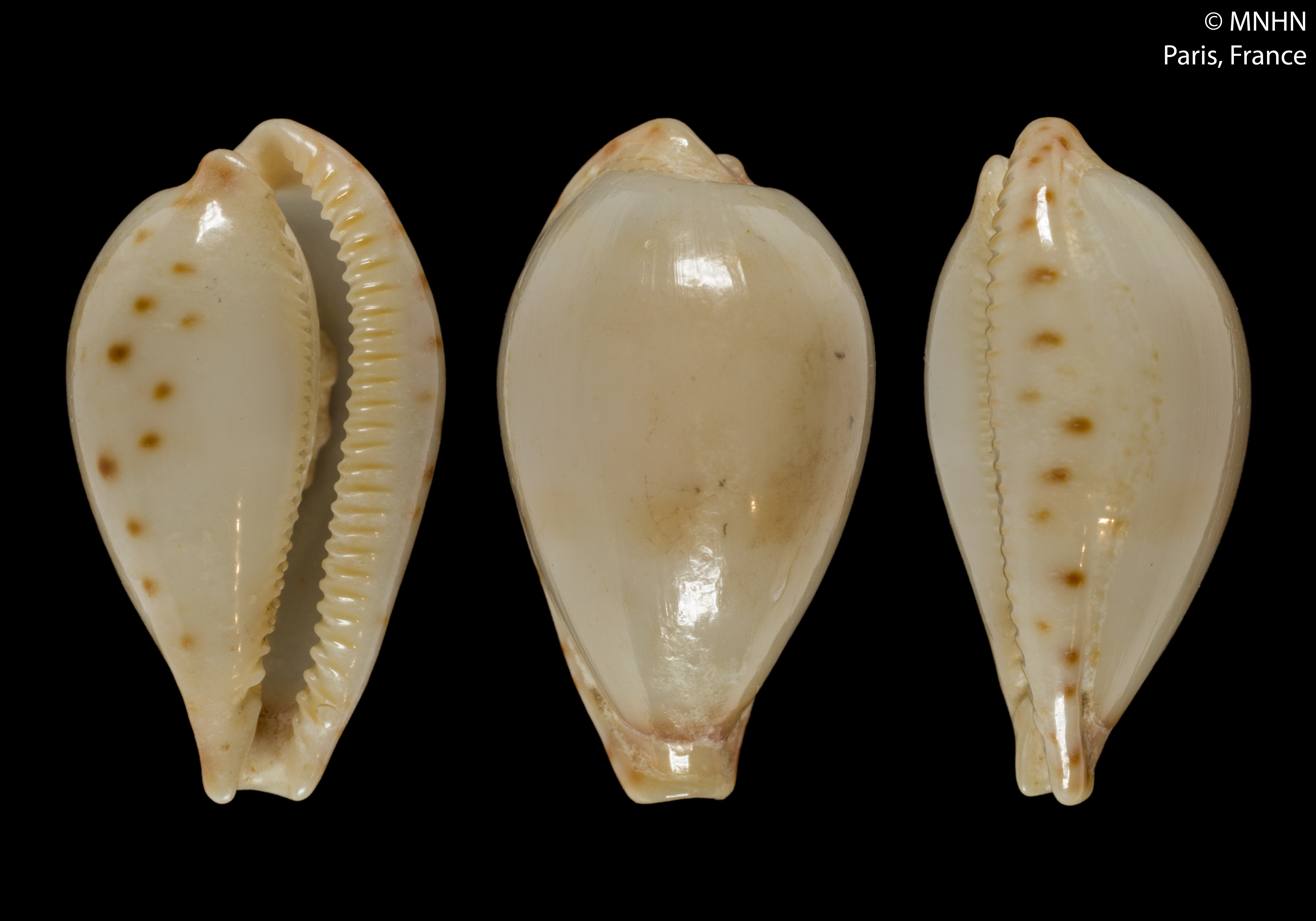
- Shell of Palmulacypraea boucheti (holotype at MNHN, Paris)

Scientific classification
- Kingdom: Animalia
- Phylum: Mollusca
- Class: Gastropoda
- Subclass: Caenogastropoda
- Order: Littorinimorpha
- Family: Cypraeidae
- Genus: Palmulacypraea
- Species: P. boucheti

Binomial name
- Palmulacypraea boucheti (Lorenz, 2002)

Synonyms
- Notadusta boucheti Lorenz, 2002 (basionym)

= Palmulacypraea boucheti =

Species of gastropod

Palmulacypraea boucheti is a species of sea snail, a cowry, a marine gastropod mollusc in the family Cypraeidae, the cowries.

== Distribution ==
This marine species occurs off the Fiji Islands.
