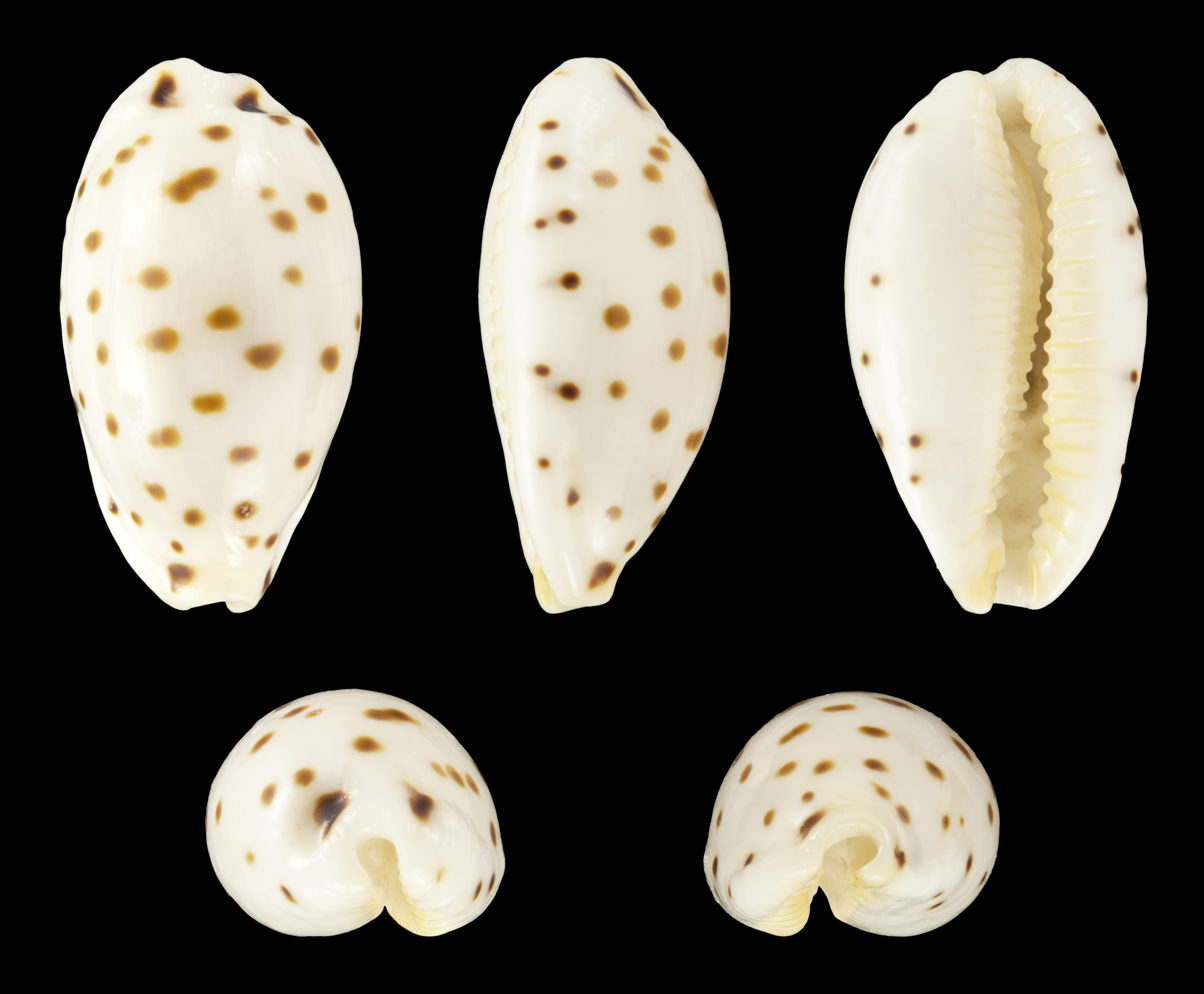
- Shell of Ransoniella punctata

Scientific classification
- Kingdom: Animalia
- Phylum: Mollusca
- Class: Gastropoda
- Subclass: Caenogastropoda
- Order: Littorinimorpha
- Family: Cypraeidae
- Genus: Ransoniella
- Species: R. punctata

Binomial name
- Ransoniella punctata (Linnaeus, 1771)

Synonyms
- See list

= Ransoniella punctata =

Brown-spotted cowry

Species of gastropod

Ransoniella punctata, common name the brown-spotted cowry, is a species of sea snail, a cowry, a marine gastropod mollusk in the family Cypraeidae, the cowries.

== Subspecies ==
- Ransoniella punctata punctata (Linnaeus, 1771)
- Ransoniella punctata berinii (Dautzenberg, 1906)
- Ransoniella punctata trizonata (Sowerby III, 1870)

== Description ==
The shell size varies between 7.5 mm and 20 mm. The dorsum surface is usually light white or yellowish, with small brown spots.

== Distribution ==
This species occurs in the Red Sea and in the Indian Ocean off Chagos, Kenya, Madagascar, the Mascarene Basin, Mauritius, Mozambique, Réunion, the Seychelles, Somalia and Tanzania and off Australia (Northern Territory, Queensland, Western Australia) and Vanuatu.

== Synonyms ==
- Cypraea atomaria Gmelin, 1791 (original combination)
- Cypraea punctata Linnaeus, 1771
- Cypraea punctata punctata Linnaeus, 1771
- Evenaria carula Iredale, 1939 (original combination)
- Notadusta punctata (Linnaeus, 1771)
- Notadusta punctata punctata (Linnaeus, 1771) · accepted, alternate representation
- Palmadusta punctata (Linnaeus, 1771)
- Palmadusta punctata atomaria (Gmelin, 1791)
- Palmadusta punctata iredalei (Schilder & Schilder, 1938) (Synonym)
- Ransoniella atomaria (Gmelin, 1791)
- Ransoniella bulbosa Dolin, 2007
- Ransoniella carula (Iredale, 1939)
- Ransoniella erminea Dolin, 2007
- Ransoniella fusula Dolin, 2007
- Ransoniella glandina Dolin, 2007
- Ransoniella iredalei (Schilder & Schilder, 1938)
- Ransoniella labiosa Dolin, 2007
- Ransoniella meyeri Dolin, 2007
- Ransoniella oryza Dolin, 2007
- Ransoniella persticta (Iredale, 1939)
- Ransoniella punctata (Linnaeus, 1771)
- Ransoniella radiosa Dolin, 2007
- Ransoniella serrata Dolin, 2007
- Ransoniella uvula Dolin, 2007
- Ransoniella vulgata Dolin, 2007
- Ransoniella zyzypha Dolin, 2007
