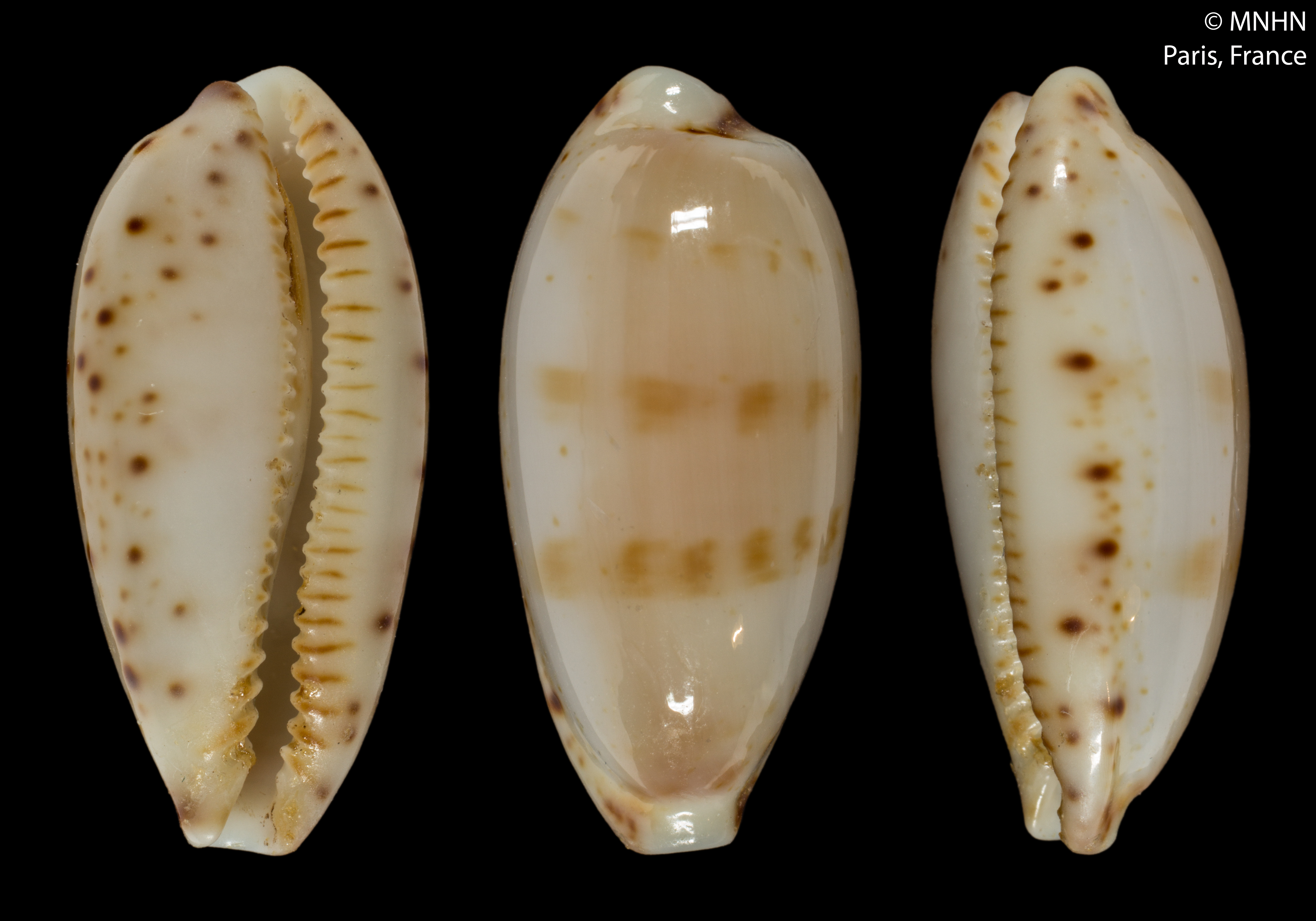
- Shell of Palmulacypraea katsuae guidoi (holotype at MNHN, Paris)

Scientific classification
- Kingdom: Animalia
- Phylum: Mollusca
- Class: Gastropoda
- Subclass: Caenogastropoda
- Order: Littorinimorpha
- Family: Cypraeidae
- Genus: Palmulacypraea
- Species: P. katsuae

Binomial name
- Palmulacypraea katsuae (Kuroda, 1960)

Synonyms
- Cypraea katsuae (Kuroda, 1960); Cypraea vicdani Lan, T.C., 1985; Erronea (Gratiadusta) katsuae Kuroda, 1960 (Original combination); Notadusta katsuae Kuroda, 1960; Palmulacypraea katsuae katsuae (Kuroda, 1960)· accepted, alternate representation

= Palmulacypraea katsuae =

Species of gastropod

Palmulacypraea katsuae, common name : Katsua's cowry, is a species of sea snail, a cowry, a marine gastropod mollusc in the family Cypraeidae, the cowries. The species was first described in 1960 by Japanese malacologist Tokubei Kuroda, who named it Erronea katsuae.

There are two subspecies :

- Palmulacypraea katsuae guidoi (Lorenz, 2002)
- Palmulacypraea katsuae katsuae (Kuroda, 1960): represented as Palmulacypraea katsuae katsuae (Kuroda, 1960)· accepted, alternate representation

== Description ==
The shell size varies between 15 mm and 24 mm. Cowries are prized for their beauty and diversity, and are mostly used for jewelry.

== Distribution ==
This species occurs in the Pacific Ocean off Japan and the Philippines; also off New Caledonia.
