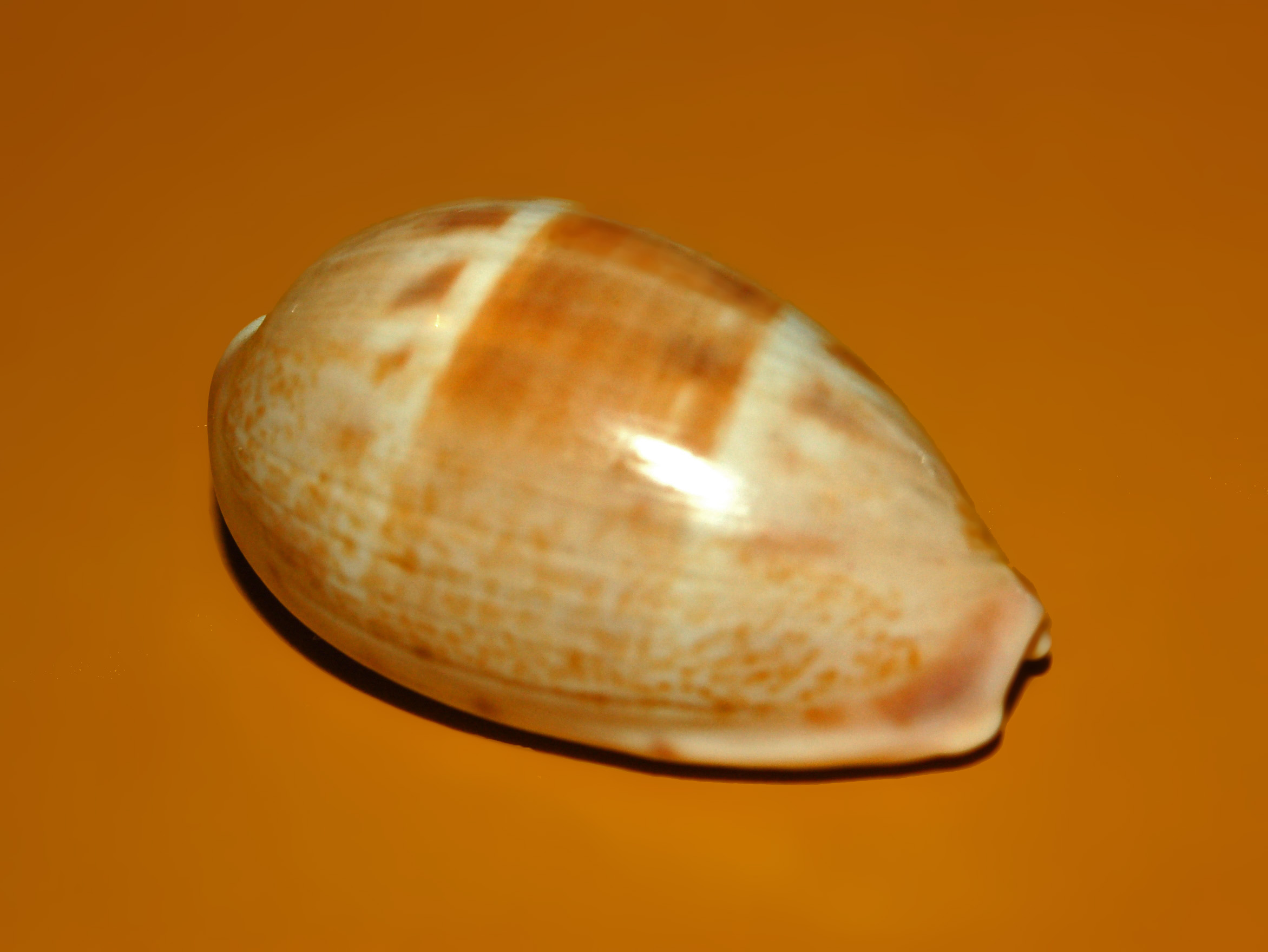
- A shell of Contradusta walkeri from Philippines, anterior end towards the right

Scientific classification
- Kingdom: Animalia
- Phylum: Mollusca
- Class: Gastropoda
- Subclass: Caenogastropoda
- Order: Littorinimorpha
- Family: Cypraeidae
- Genus: Contradusta
- Species: C. walkeri

Binomial name
- Contradusta walkeri (Sowerby I, 1832)

Synonyms
- Cypraea walkeri (Sowerby I, 1832) (basionym); Cypraea amabilis Jousseaume, 1881; Erronea walkeri continens merista (f) Iredale, 1939

= Contradusta walkeri =

Species of gastropod

Contradusta walkeri is a species of sea snail, a cowry, a marine gastropod mollusk in the family Cypraeidae, the cowries.

== Subspecies ==
- Contradusta walkeri continens (Iredale, 1935)
- Contradusta walkeri surabajensis Schilder, F.A., 1937
- Contradusta walkeri walkeri (Sowerby I, 1832)

== Description ==
The shells of these common cowries reach on average 19–23 millimetres (0.75–0.91 in)of length, with a minimum size of 14 millimetres (0.55 in) and a maximum size of 39 millimetres (1.5 in). The shape is usually oval, the dorsum surface is smooth and shiny, the basic color is pale brown, with a wide darker brown trasversal band and some small irregular brown patches on the top. The margins are white, with several brown dots. The base may be white, purple or cream and the wide and sinuous aperture shows long labial teeth. The interior of the shell may be purple. In the living cowries the mantle is transparent, with short sensorial papillae.

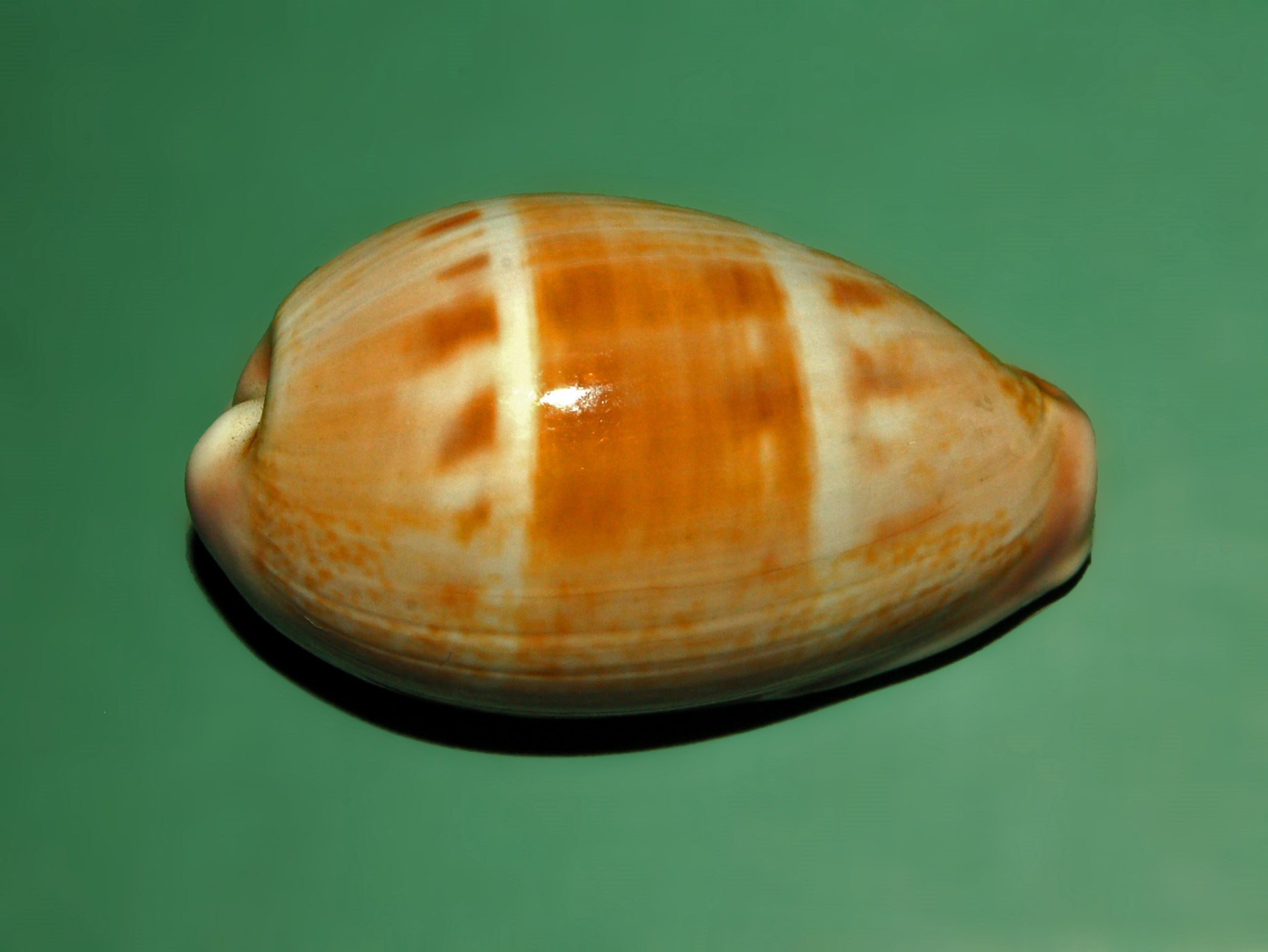
A shell of Contradusta walkeri from Philippines, dorsal view, anterior end towards the right

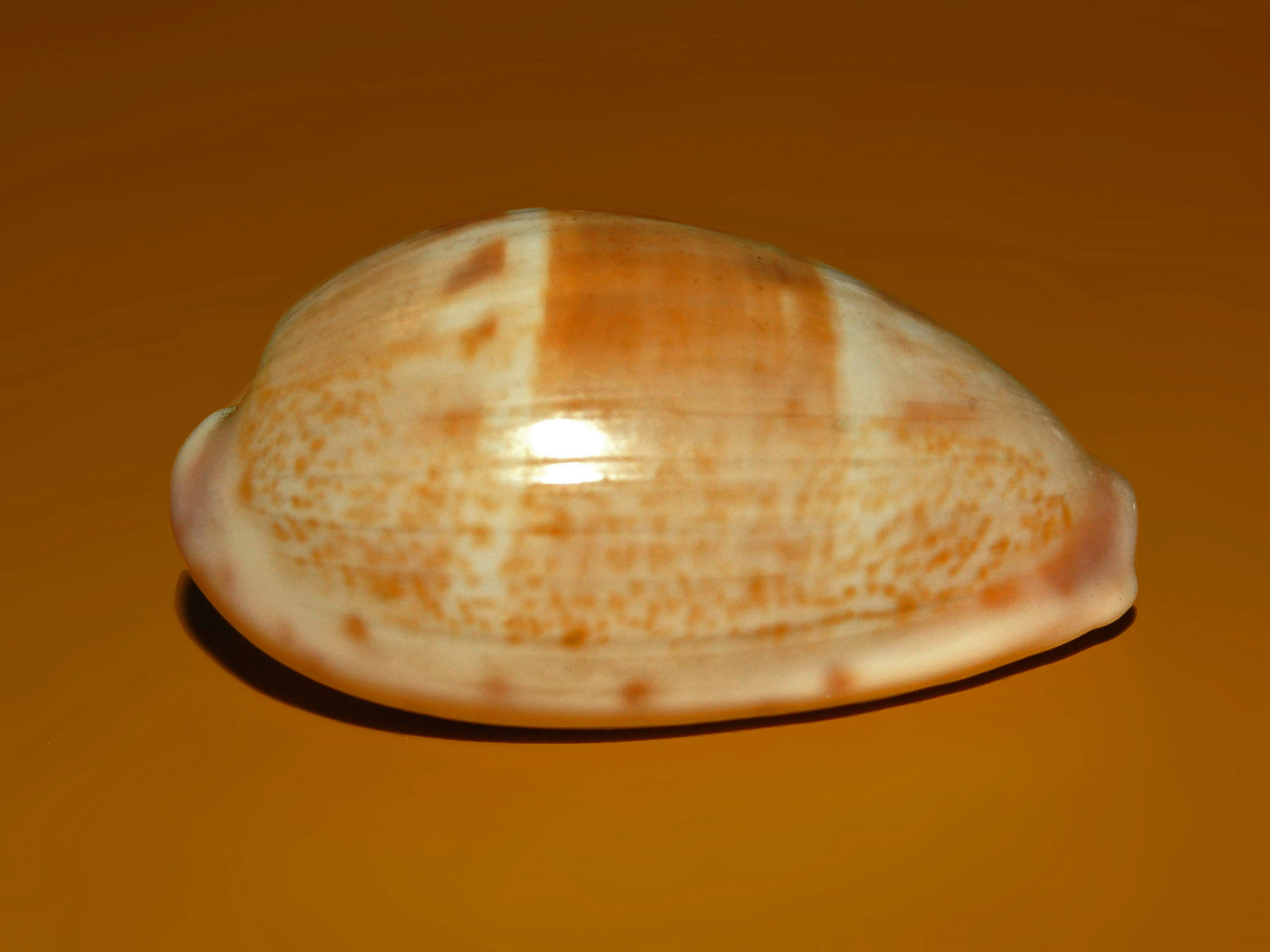
A shell of Contradusta walkeri from Philippines, lateral view, anterior end towards the right

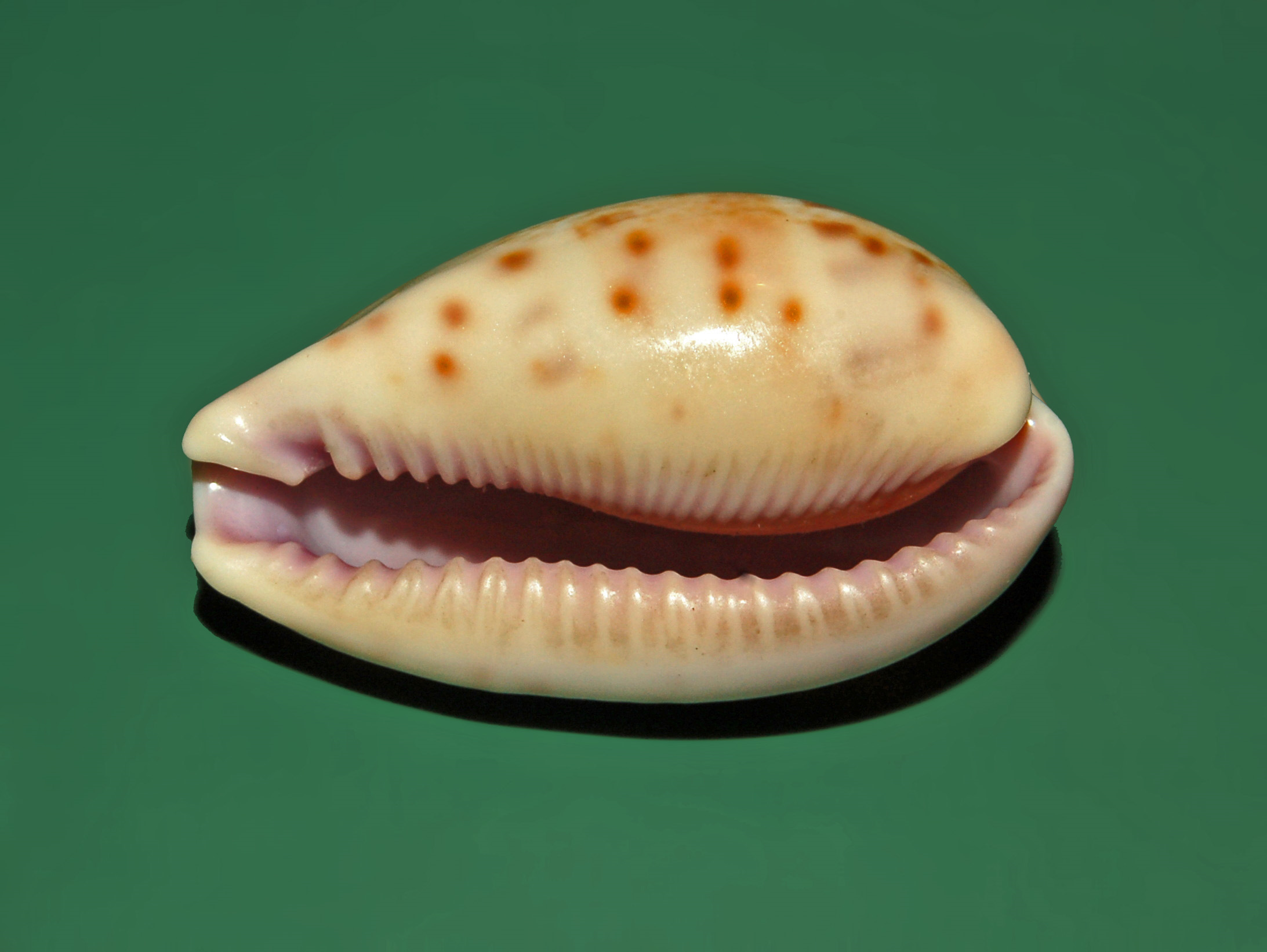
A shell of Contradusta walkeri from Philippines, ventral view, anterior end towards the left

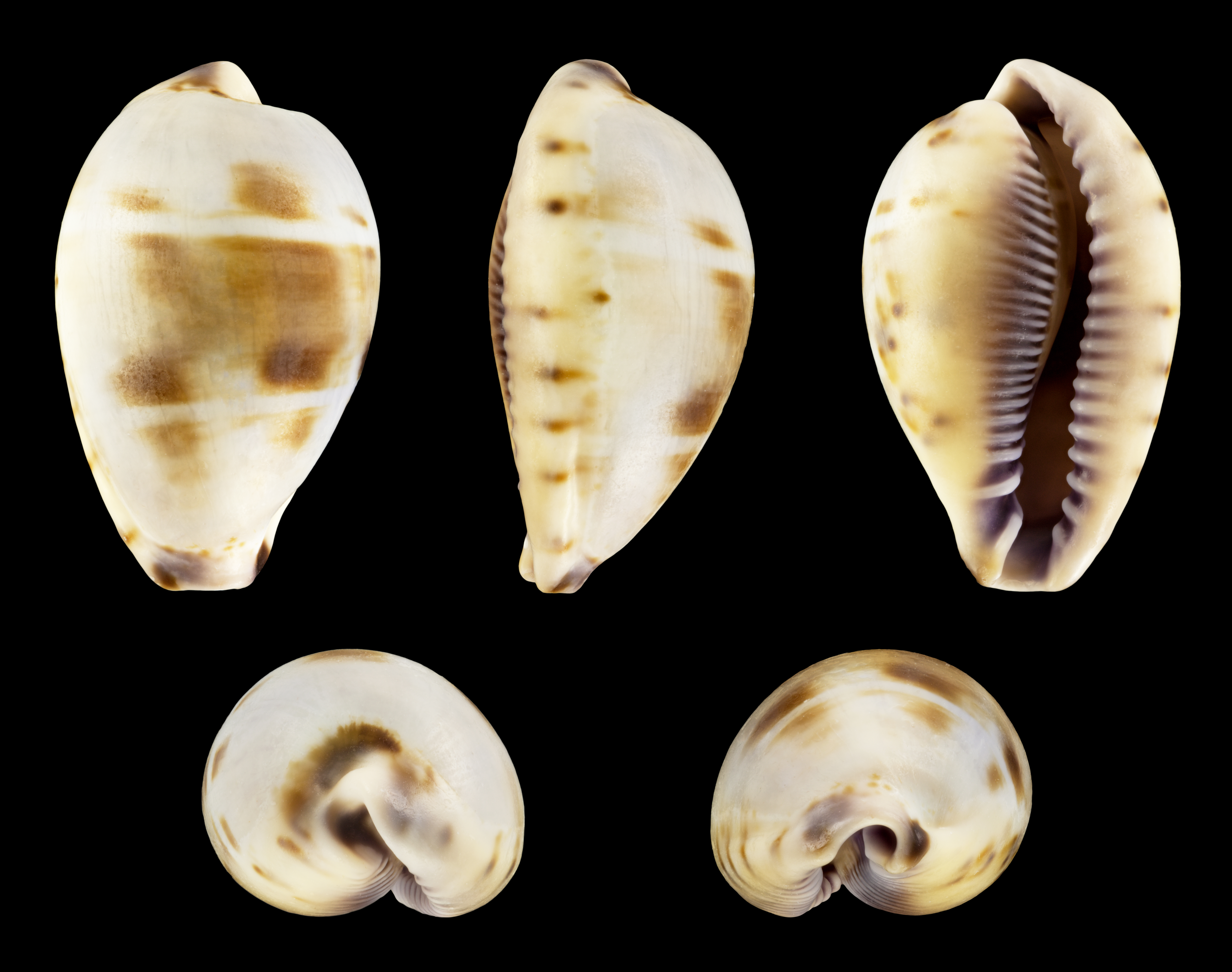
A shell of Contradusta walkeri ssp. surabajensis from Japan

== Distribution ==
This species is distributed in the Red Sea, in the Indian Ocean along the Seychelles, in the West Pacific along South East Asia, the Philippines, Melanesia and Australia.

== Habitat ==
They live in tropical subtidal waters and in continental shelf at about 5–25 metres (16–82 ft) of depth, usually on coral reef or under rocks.
