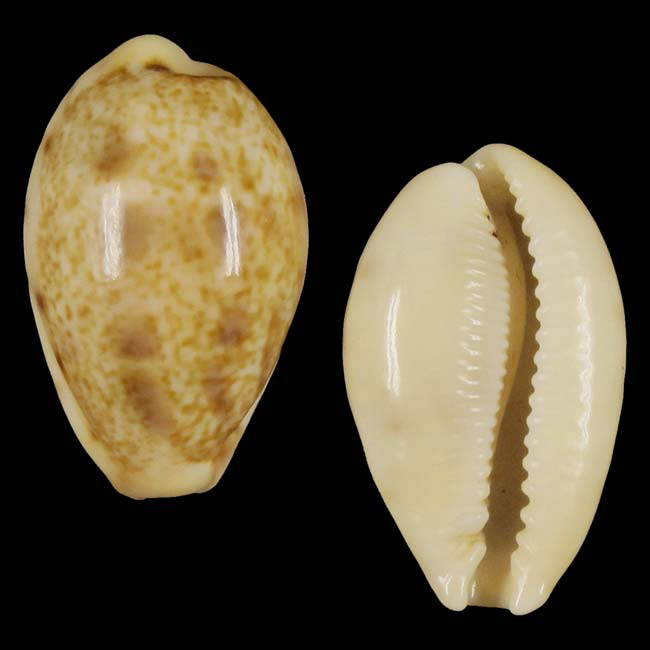

Scientific classification
- Kingdom: Animalia
- Phylum: Mollusca
- Class: Gastropoda
- Subclass: Caenogastropoda
- Order: Littorinimorpha
- Family: Cypraeidae
- Genus: Contradusta
- Species: C. lapillus

Binomial name
- Contradusta lapillus Poppe, Tagaro & Groh, 2013

= Contradusta lapillus =

Species of gastropod

Contradusta lapillus is a species of sea snail, a marine gastropod mollusk in the family Cypraeidae.

== Original description ==
- Poppe G.T., Tagaro S.P. & Groh K. (2013) A new species of Contradusta (Gastropoda: Cypraeidae) from the Philippines. Visaya 4(1): 95–101. [February 2013].
