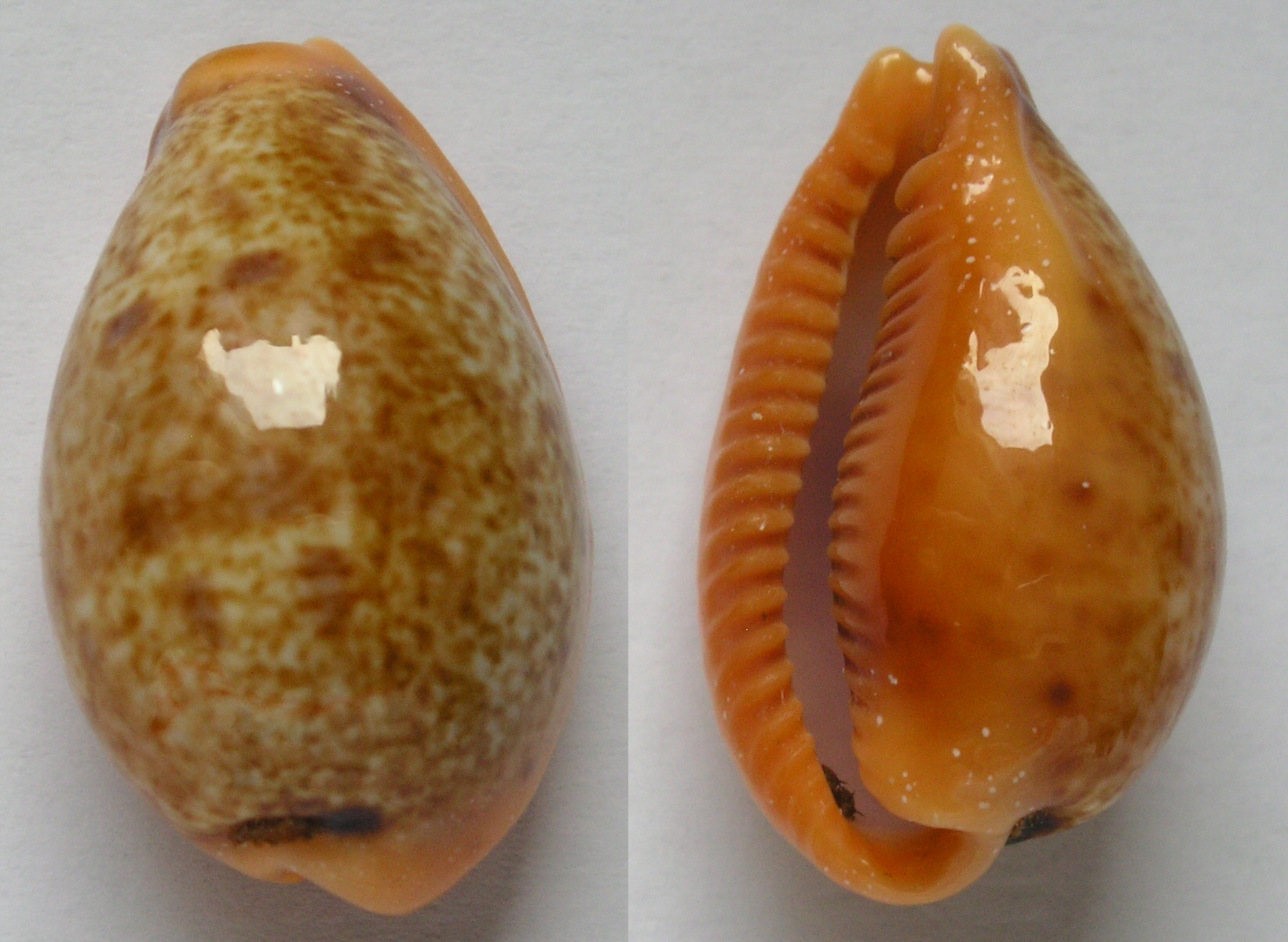
- Two views of a shell of Contradusta bregeriana, anterior end at the top

Scientific classification
- Kingdom: Animalia
- Phylum: Mollusca
- Class: Gastropoda
- Subclass: Caenogastropoda
- Order: Littorinimorpha
- Family: Cypraeidae
- Genus: Contradusta; Meyer, 2003

Type species
- Cypraea walkeri J. E. Gray in G. B. Sowerby I, 1832

= Contradusta =

Genus of gastropods

Contradusta is a genus of sea snails, marine gastropod mollusks in the family Cypraeidae, the cowries.

== Species ==
Species within the genus Contradusta include:

- Contradusta bregeriana (Crosse, 1868)
- Contradusta lapillus Poppe, Tagaro & Groh, 2013
- Contradusta walkeri (Sowerby I, 1832)

Species brought into synonymy

- Contradusta barclayi (Reeve, 1857): synonym of Paradusta barclayi (Reeve, 1857)
- Contradusta pulchella (Swainson, 1823): synonym of Ficadusta pulchella (Swainson, 1823)
