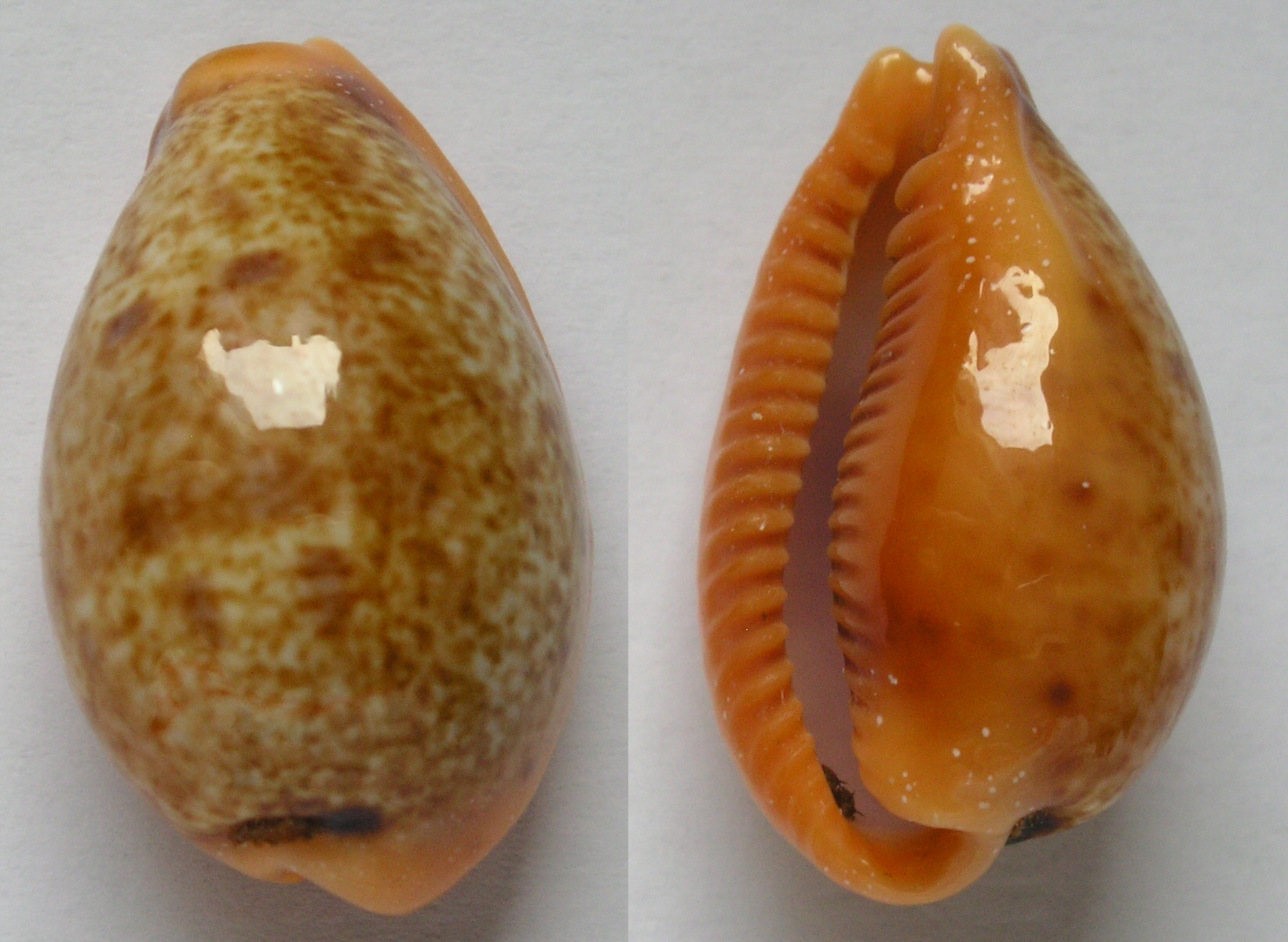
- Two views of a shell of Contradusta bregeriana, anterior end at the top

Scientific classification
- Kingdom: Animalia
- Phylum: Mollusca
- Class: Gastropoda
- Subclass: Caenogastropoda
- Order: Littorinimorpha
- Family: Cypraeidae
- Genus: Contradusta
- Species: C. bregeriana

Binomial name
- Contradusta bregeriana (Crosse, 1868)

Synonyms
- Contradusta bregeriana bregeriana (Crosse, 1868); Cypraea bregeriana Crosse, 1868; Erronea bregeriana (Crosse, 1868); Erronea bregeriana bregeriana (Crosse, 1868)

= Contradusta bregeriana =

Species of gastropod

Contradusta bregeriana is a species of sea snail, a cowry, a marine gastropod mollusk in the family Cypraeidae, the cowries.

Subspecies
Contradusta bregeriana pervelata (Lorenz, 2002) (taxon inquirendum)
