= List of marine gastropods of South Africa =

List of the species of sea snails and sea slugs of South Africa

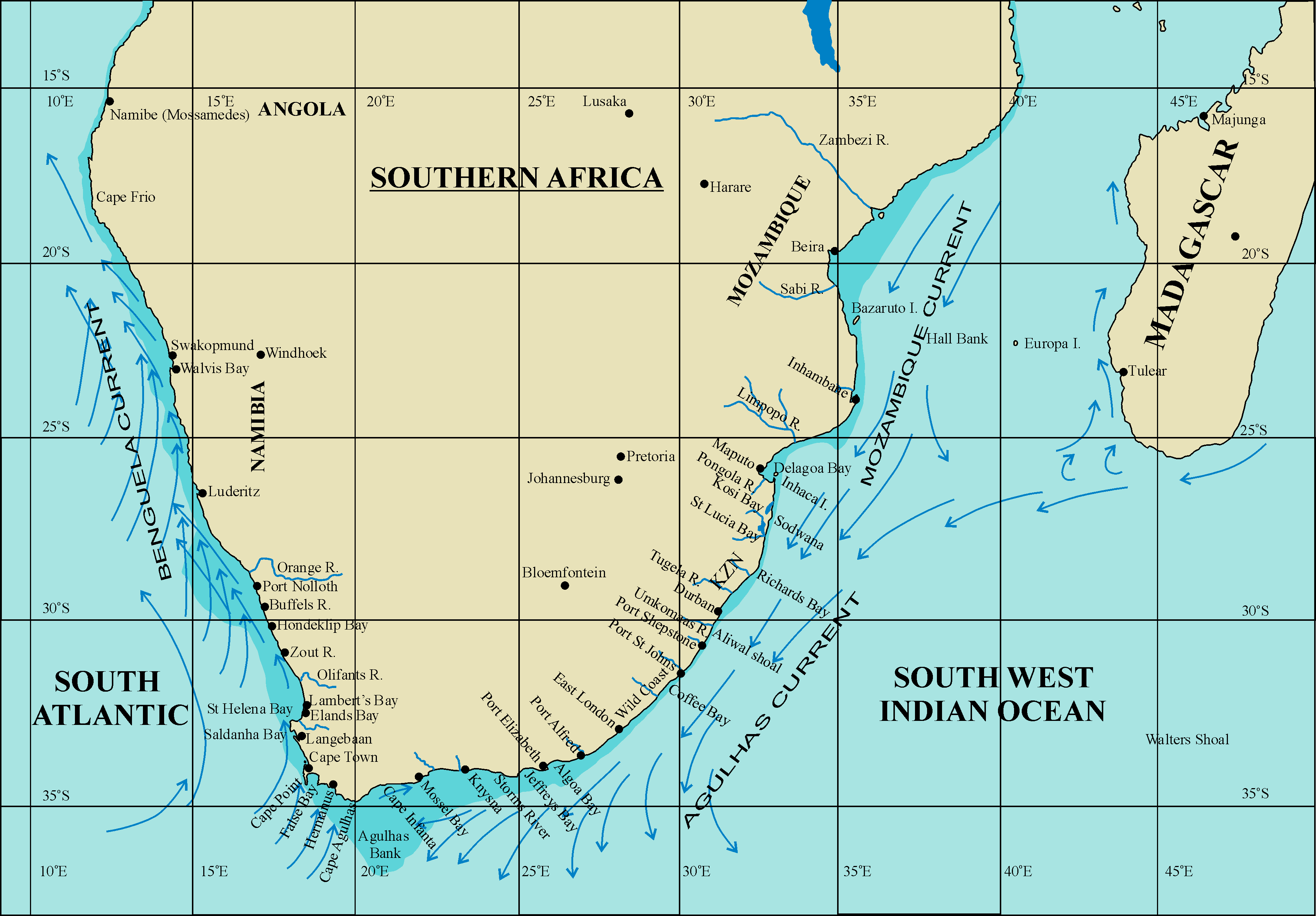
Map of the Southern African coastline showing some of the landmarks referred to in species range statements

This list of marine gastropods of South Africa attempts to list all of the sea snails and sea slugs of South Africa, in other words the marine gastropod molluscs of that area. This list is a sub-list of the List of marine molluscs of South Africa.

Gastropods (/ˈɡæstrəpɒdz/; previously known as Univalves; class Gastropoda /ɡæsˈtrɒpədə/) are a vast and diverse group of invertebrates within the phylum Mollusca, comprising the animals commonly known as snails and slugs. With an estimated 65,000 to 80,000 living species, they form the second-largest animal class after the insects. The fossil record of gastropods extends back to the Late Cambrian. As of 2017, 721 families are recognized—476 extant (some with fossil representatives) and 245 extinct known only from fossils.

Gastropods inhabit an extraordinary range of environments, including marine, freshwater, and terrestrial ecosystems. They occur in gardens, woodlands, deserts, mountains, rivers, lakes, estuaries, mudflats, intertidal zones, the deep sea, hydrothermal vents, and even in parasitic niches.

The term snail generally refers to gastropods with a large external shell into which the body can fully retract, while slugs have no shell or a small internal one, and semislugs can only partially withdraw into their reduced shell. Marine gastropods include familiar forms such as abalones, conches, periwinkles, whelks, and cowries, whose shells are usually coiled in adulthood. In contrast, limpets and related groups coil their shells only in the larval stage, retaining a simple conical form as adults. (Full article...)

== Gastropoda ==
Marine gastropods in South Africa include:

=== Patellogastropoda ===
Patellidae - True limpets

- Cellana radiata capensis (Gmelin, 1791)(Port Alfred to Kenya) (syn. Cellana capensis Gmelin, Helcioniscus capensis (Gmelin, 1790), Patella capensis Gmelin, 1791)
- Variable limpet Helcion concolor Krauss, 1848 (Eastern Cape to Mozambique)
- Helcion dunkeri Krauss, 1848 (Namibia to KwaZulu-Natal)
- Prickly limpet Helcion pectunculus (Gmelin, 1791) (Namibia to central KwaZulu-Natal)
- Rayed limpet Helcion pruinosus Krauss, 1848 (Cape Columbine to central KwaZulu-Natal)
- Patella aphanes (Robson, 1986) (Transkei to Cape Vidal) (syn. Scutellastra aphanes)
- Argenville's limpet Patella argenvillei Krauss, 1848 (Namibia to KwaZulu-Natal south coast) (syn. Scutellastra argenvillei)
- Bearded limpet Patella barbara Linnaeus, 1758 (Orange river to central KwaZulu-Natal) (syn. Scutellastra barbara)
- Pear limpet Patella cochlear Born, 1778 (Orange river to KwaZulu-Natal south coast) (syn. Scutellastra cochlear)
- Kelp limpet Patella compressa Linnaeus. 1758 (Namibia to Cape Point) (syn. Cymbula compressa)
- Patella flexuosa (Quoy & Gaimard, 1834) (Northern KwaZulu-Natal to Mzambique) (syn. Scutellastra flexuosa)
- Granite limpet Patella granatina Linnaeus, 1758 (Namibia to Cape Agulhas) (syn. Cymbula granatina)
- Granular limpet Patella granularis Linnaeus, 1758 (Namibia to KwaZulu-Natal north coast) (syn. Scutellastra granularis)
- Duck's foot or Long-spined limpet Patella longicosta Lamarck, 1819 (Cape Point to central KwaZulu-Natal) (syn. Scutellastra longicosta)
- Pink rayed limpet Patella miniata Born, 1778 (Namibia to Eastern Cape) (syn. Cymbula miniata)
- Patella obtecta Krauss, 1848 (Transkei to Kosi Bay) (syn. Scutellastra obtecta)
- Goat's eye limpet Patella oculus Born, 1778 (Cape Columbine to KwaZulu-Natal south coast) (syn. Cymbula oculus)
- Patella pica Reeve, 1854 (Zululand to Mozambique) (syn. Scutellastra pica)
- Patella sanguinans Reeve, 1856 (Transkei to Natal) (syn. Cymbula sanguinans, Patella miniata sanguinans)
- Giant limpet Patella tabularis Krauss, 1848 (Cape Point to KwaZulu-Natal south coast) (syn. Scutellastra tabularis)

Lottiidae - True limpets

- Dwarf limpet Patelloida profunda albonotata (Smith, E.A., 1910) (Eastern Cape to northern KwaZulu-Natal)

=== Vetigastropoda ===
Pleurotomariidae

- Bayerotrochus africanus (Tomlin, 1948) (Central KwaZulu-Natal to Mozambique)

Haliotidae - Abalone

- Perlemoen or Abalone Haliotis midae Linnaeus, 1758 (Cape Columbine to KwaZulu-Natal South coast)
- Haliotis ovina Gmelin 1791 (Northern KwaZulu-Natal to Mozambique)
- Spiral-ridged siffie Haliotis parva Linnaeus, 1758 (Cape Point to Eastern Cape)
- Haliotis pustulata Reeve, 1846 (Northern KwaZulu-Natal to Mozambique)
- Haliotis queketti Smith, E.A., 1910 (Port Alfred to KwaZulu-Natal)
- Siffie or Venus ear Haliotis spadicea Donovan, E., 1808 (Cape Point to KwaZulu-Natal north coast)
- Beautiful ear-shell Haliotis speciosa Reeve, 1846 (Eastern Cape to central KwaZulu-Natal)

Fissurellidae - Keyhole limpets

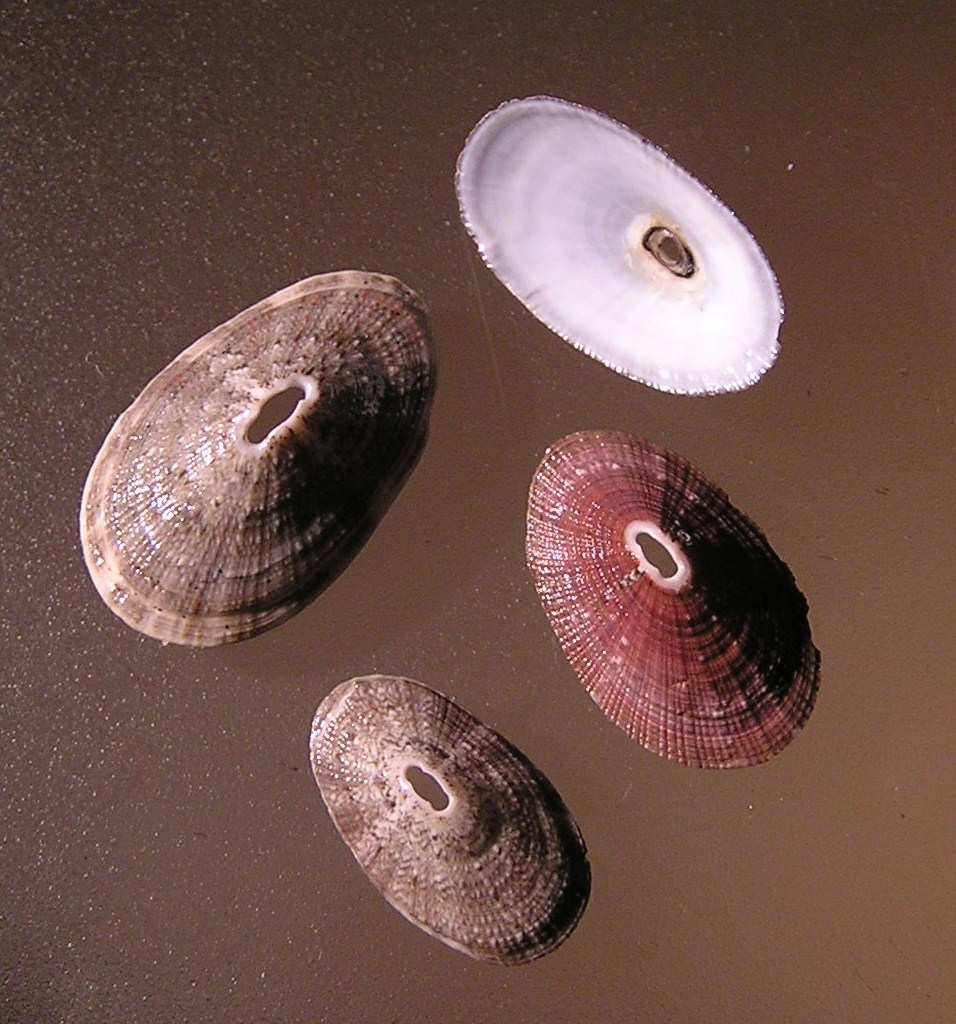
Fissurella mutabilis

- Amblychilepas dubia (Reeve, 1849) (KwaZulu-Natal south coast to southern Mozambique)
- Saddle shaped keyhole limpet Amblychilepas scutella (Gmelin, 1791) (Namibia to northern KwaZulu-Natal) (syn. Dendrofissurella scutellum (Gmelin, 1791))
- Conical keyhole limpet Diodora parviforata (G.B. Sowerby III, 1889) (Orange river to Eastern Cape) (syn. Fissurella parviforata G.B. Sowerby III, 1889)
- Diodora australis (Sowerby, 1823) (Cape Agulhas to western Transkei)
- Diodora calyculata (Krauss, 1848) (Port Alfred to southern Mozambique)
- Diodora crucifera (Pilsbry, 1890) (Port Alfred to northern Indian Ocean)
- Diodora elevata (Dunker, 1846) (Saldanha Bay to western Transkei)
- Diodora elizabethae (Smith, 1901) (Still Bay to KwaZulu-Natal north coast)
- Diodora natalensis (Krauss, 1848) (Port Alfred to Mozambique) (syn. Fissurella natalensis Krauss, 1848)
- Diodora parviforata (Sowerby, 1889) (Saldanha Bay to Port Alfred, also south Atlantic islands)
- Diodora procurva Herbert, 1989 (Wild coast to KawZulu-Natal)
- Diodora spreta (E.A. Smith, 1901) (Still Bay to KwaZulu-Natal north coast)
- Cape keyhole limpet Fissurella mutabilis Sowerby, 1834 (Orange River to Eastern Cape)
- Emarginula sibogae (Schepman, 1908) (KwaZulu-Natal to Mozambique) but genus given in this reference as Emarginella. Corrected using http://www.marinespecies.org/ accessed 4 January 2010
- Macroschisma africana Tomlin, 1932 (Western Transkei to Mozambique)
- Mantled keyhole limpet Pupillaea aperta (G.B. Sowerby I, 1825) (Orange river to KwaZulu-Natal south coast) (syn. Fissurellidea aperta G.B. Sowerby, 1825)
- Scutus unguis (Linne, 1758) (East London to KwaZulu-Natal and tropical Indo-Pacific)

Calliostomatidae

- Calliostoma africanum Bartsch, 1915 (Port Elizabeth to Transkei)
- Calliostoma circus Barnard, 1969 (Cape Point)
- Calliostoma iridescens Sowerby, 1903 (KwaZulu-Natal)
- Ornate topshell Calliostoma ornatum Locard, 1898 (Cape Point to Eastern Cape)
- Calliostoma scotti Kilburn, 1973 (Central and northern KwaZulu-Natal)

Trochidae

- Black chained topshell Clanculus atricatena Tomlin, 1921 (Transkei to northern KwaZulu Natal)
- Clanculus puniceus (Philippi, 1846) (KwaZulu-Natal south coast to tropical Indo-Pacific)
- Clanculus miniatus (Anton, 1839) (Cape Point to Transkei)
- Multicoloured topshell Gibbula multicolor (Krauss, 1848) (Cape Columbine to Eastern Cape)(syn. Trochus multicolor Krauss, 1848)
- Gibbula beckeri G.B. Sowerby III, 1901 (Namaqualand to Cape Point)
- Gibbula capensis (Gmelin, 1791) (Saldanha to Agulhas)(syn. Trochus capensis Gmelin, 1791)
- Gibbula cicer (Menke, 1844) (Namibia to Transkei) (syn. Trochus cicer Menke, 1844)
- Gibbula zonata (Woods, 1828) (Namibia to Agulhas)
- Toothed topshell Monodonta australis Lamarck, 1816
- Oxystele impervia (Menke, 1843)
- Pink-lipped topshell Oxystele sinensis (Gmelin 1791)
- Oxystele tabularis (Krauss, 1848)
- Oxystele tigrina (Anton, 1839)
- Variegated topshell Oxystele variegata (Anton, 1839)
- Black-spotted topshell Trochus nigropunctatus Reeve, 1861

Turbinidae - Turban shells

- Bolma andersoni (E.A. Smith, 1902) (Wild Coast and southern KwaZulu-Natal)
- Bolma bathyraphis (E.A. Smith, 1899) (KwaZulu-Natal and Mozambique)
- Bolma massieri (E.A. Smith, 1880) (KwaZulu-Natal)
- Bolma tayloriana Bozzetti, 1992 (Agulhas Bank, False Bay to Port Alfred)
- Turbo argyrostomus Linnaeus, 1758 (KwaZulu-Natal and Mozambique)
- Turbo argyrostomus Linnaeus, 1758 (KwaZulu-Natal and Mozambique)
- Turbo chrysostomus Linnaeus, 1758 (northern KwaZulu-Natal and Mozambique)
- Alikreukel or Giant periwinkle Turbo sarmaticus Linnaeus, 1758 (Cape Point to Kwa-Zulu-Natal south coast)
- Crowned turban shell Lunella coronata (Gmelin, 1791) (Central KwaZulu-Natal to Mozambique) (syn. Turbo coronatus Gmelin, 1790)
- Turbo cidaris
  - Turbo cidaris cidaris Gmelin, 1791 (Cape Peninsula to Port Elizabeth)
  - Turbo cidaris natalensis (Port Elizabeth to north of Durban)
- Cinysca granulosa Krauss, 1848 (Namibia to eastern Transkei)

Phasianellidae

- Tricolia adusta Nangammbi & Herbert, 2006
- Pheasant shell Tricolia capensis (Dunker, 1846) (Namibia to Mozambique) (syn. Phasianella capensis Dunker, 1846)
- Tricolia neritina (Dunker, 1846) (Namibia to Mozambique)(syn. Phasianella neritina Dunker, 1846)
- Tricolia retrolineata Nangammbi & Herbert, 2008 - northeastern South Africa
- Tricolia saxatilis Nangammbi & Herbert, 2006

=== Neritimorpha ===
Neritidae - Nerites

- Blotched nerite Nerita albicilla Linnaeus, 1758 (Eastern cape to Mozambique)
- Nerita plicata Linnaeus, 1758 (Western Transkei to tropics)
- Nerita polita Linnaeus, 1758 (East London to tropical Indo-Pacific)
- Textile nerite Nerita textilis Gmelin, 1791 (Transkei to Mozambique)

=== Caenogastropoda ===
Calyptraeidae - Slipper limpets

- Crepidula aculeata (Gmelin, 1791) (Namibia to KwaZulu-Natal)
- Crepidula dilatata Lamarck, 1822 (Lambert's Bay to Mossel Bay)
- Slipper limpet Crepidula porcellana (Linnaeus, 1758) (Namibia to KwaZulu-Natal north coast)
- Chinese hat Calyptraea chinensis (Linnaeus, 1758) (Namibia to Transkei)
- Calyptraea helicoidea Sowerby, 1883 (Port Elizabeth to East London)

Hipponicidae - Hoof limpets

- Horse's hoof Hipponix conicus (Schumacher, 1817) (Cape Point to Mozambique)

Littorinidae

- Striped periwinkle Littoraria glabrata (Philippi, 1846) (Transkei to Mozambique) (Syn. Littorina kraussi Rosewater, 1970, Littorina glabrata Philippi, 1846)
- Estuarine periwinkles Littoraria scabra group. (Eastern Cape to Mozambique)
  - Littoraria scabra Linnaeus, 1758
  - Littoraria intermedia (Philippi, 1846)
  - Littoraria subvittata Reid, 1986
- African periwinkle Nodilittorina africana (Philippi, 1847) (Namibia to northern KwaZulu-Natal)
- Nodular periwinkle Nodilittorina natalensis Philippi, 1847 (Eastern Cape to Mozambique)

Assimineidae

- Globular mud snail Assiminea globulus Connoly, 1939 (Cape Columbine to Eastern Cape)
- Assiminea ovata Krauss, 1848 (Knysna to Mozambique)

Vermetidae - Worm shells

- Colonial worm shell Dendropoma corallinaceum (Tomlin, 1939) (Orange river to Transkei) (syn. Vermetus (Stoa) corallinaceus Tomlin, 1939)
- Dendropoma tholia (Transkei to Natal)
- Solitary worm shell Serpulorbis natalensis Mörch, 1862 (Namaqualand to central Kwa-Zulu-Natal)

Turritellidae

- Waxy screw shell Protoma (Protomella) capensis (Namibia to Eastern Cape) (syn. Turritella capensis)
- Turritella carinifera Lamarck, 1799 (Western Cape to southern Mozambique)
- Turritella chrysostomus Linnaeus, 1758 (northern KwaZulu-Natal and Mozambique)
- Turritella chrysotoxa Tomlin, 1925 (Wild Coast and KwaZulu-Natal)
- Turritella declivis A. Adams & Reeve, 1850 (Agulhas Bank)
- Turritella natalensis E.A. Smith, 1910 (KwaZulu-Natal)
- Pale screw shell Turritella sanguinea Reeve, 1849 (Cape Point to Natal)

Potamididae

- Truncated mangrove snail Cerithidea decollata Linnaeus, 1758 (Eastern Cape to Mozambique)
- Mangrove whelk Terebralia palustris Bruguière (Central KwaZulu-Natal to Mozambique)

Cerithiidae

- Knobbed horn shell Rhinoclavis sinensis Gmelin, 1791 (Transkei to Mozambique)
- Cerithium citrinum Sowerby, 1855 (Durban to Mozambique)
- Cerithium crassilabrum (East London to Mozambique)
- Cerithium echinatum Lamarck, 1822 (northern KwaZulu-Natal and Mozambique)
- Rhinoclavis alexandri (Tomlin, 1923) (KwaZulu-Natal)
- Rhinoclavis articulata (Adams & Reeve, 1850) (KwaZulu-Natal and Mozambique)
- Rhinoclavis diadema Houbrick, 1978 (KwaZulu-Natal and Mozambique)

Xenophoridae

- Stellaria gigantea (Schepman, 1909) (Central KwaZulu-Natal to Mozambique)
- Sun carrier shell Stellaria solaris (Linnaeus, 1764) (KwaZulu-Natal and Mozambique)
- Stellaria testigera digitata (von Martens, 1878) (Namibia)
- Xenophora corrugata (Reeve, 1842) (Northern KwaZulu-Natal and Mozambique)
- Xenophora pallidula (Reeve, 1842) (KwaZulu-Natal and Mozambique)
- Xenophora tulearensis Stewart & Kosuge, 1993 (Central KwaZulu-Natal and Mozambique)

Turridae

- Ribbed turrid Clionella sinuata Born, 1778 (Namibia to Eastern Cape)
- Clionella rosaria (Cape Point to KwaZulu-Natal)

Cypraeidae - True cowries

- Cypraea alfredensis (Schilder and Schilder, 1929) (Cape St. Francis and north/east) (syn. Cypraeovula alfredensis (Cape St. Francis to southern Wild Coast))
- Cypraea algoensis Gray, 1825 (Cape Agulhas and north/(east?)) (syn. Cypraeovula algoensis (Table Bay to Algoa Bay))
- Cypraea amphithales Melvill, 1888 (Algoa Bay and north/east) (syn. Cypraeovula amphithales (Algoa Bay to Kei River Mouth))
- Ring cowrie Cypraea annulus Linnaeus, 1758 (Algoa Bay to Mozambique)
- Arabic cowrie Cypraea arabica Linnaeus, 1758 (Algoa Bay to Mozambique)
- Cypraea barclayi Reeve, 1857 (Cape St Blaize and north/east) (syn. Erronea barclayi (Cape St Blaize to Mozambique))
- Cypraea beckii Gaskoin, 1856 (Park Rynie and north)
- Cypraea broderipii Sowerby II, 1832 (Port Edward and north) (syn. Lyncina broderipii (KwaZulu-Natal and Mozambique))
- Cape cowrie Cypraea capensis Gray, 1828 (Jeffreys Bay to central KwaZulu-Natal) (syn. Cypraeovula capensis)
- Snake's head cowrie Cypraea caputserpentis Linnaeus, 1758 (Still Bay to Mozambique)
- Carnelian cowrie Cypraea carneola Linnaeus, 1758 (Jeffreys Bay to Mozambique)
- Cypraea caurica Linnaeus, 1758 (Scottburgh and north)
- Cypraea cernica Sowerby II, 1870 (Port Edward and north) (Syn. Erosaria cernica (KwaZulu-Natal and Mozambique))
- Cypraea chinensis Gmelin, 1791 (Jeffreys Bay and north)
- Cypraea cicercula Linnaeus, 1758 (Sodwana Bay and north)
- Orange cowrie Cypraea citrina Gray, 1825 (Jeffreys Bay to Mozambique) (Syn. Erosaria citrina)
- Cypraea clandestina Linnaeus, 1758 (Jeffreys Bay and north)
- Cypraea cohenae Burgess, 1965 (Jeffreys Bay and north) (syn. Cypraeovula cohenae)
- Cypraea connelli Liltved, 1983 (East London to central KwaZulu-Natal) (syn. Cypraeovula connelli )
- Cypraea contaminata Sowerby II, 1832 (Coffee Bay and north)
- Cypraea coronata (Schilder, 1930) (Dassen Island to Kei River Mouth) (syn. Cypraeovula coronata)
- Cypraea cribraria Linnaeus, 1758 (Jeffreys Bay and Mozambique) (syn. Cribrarula cribraria comma [KwaZulu-Natal and Mozambique])
- Cypraea diluculum Reeve, 1845 (Nthlonyane and north)
- Toothless cowrie Cypraea edentula Gray, 1825 (Tsitsikamma to Transkei) (syn. Cypraeovula edentula)
- Eroded cowrie Cypraea erosa Linnaeus, 1758 (Knysna estuary to Mozambique)
- Kitten cowrie Cypraea felina Gmelin, 1791 (Port Alfred to Mozambique)
- Cypraea fimbriata Gmelin, 1791 (Jeffreys Bay and north)
- Cypraea fultoni Sowerby III, 1903 (Haga Haga and north) (Syn. Barycypraea fultoni (Wild Coast to northern KwaZulu-Natal))
- Dark toothed cowrie Cypraea fuscodentata Gray, 1825 (Cape Point to Tsitsikamma) (syn. Cypraeovula fuscodentata)
- Cypraea fuscorubra Shaw, 1909 (Namaqualand to Cape Agulhas) (syn. Cypraeovula fuscorubra)
- Cypraea gangranosa Dillwyn, 1817 (Port Edward and north) (syn. Erosaria gangranosa (KwaZulu-Natal and Mozambique))
- Honey cowrie Cypraea helvola Linnaeus, 1758 (Jeffreys Bay to Mozambique)
- Cypraea histrio Gmelin, 1791 (Scottborough and north)
- Cypraea isabella Linnaeus, 1758 (Coffee Bay and north) (syn. Luria isabella (Wild Coast to Mozambique))
- Cypraea iutsui Shikama, 1974 (syn. Cypraeovula iutsui (Olifants River Mouth (West Coast) to Port Alfred))
- Cypraea labrolineata Gaskoin, 1848 (Sodwana Bay and north)
- Cypraea lamarckii Gray, 1828 (Jeffreys Bay and north)
- Cypraea limacina Lamarck, 1810 (Mngazana and north)
- Cypraea lisetae Kilburn, 1975 (Durban and north)
- Cypraea lynx Linnaeus, 1758 (Mazeppa Bay and north)
- Cypraea mappa Linnaeus, 1758 (Park Rynie) (syn. Leporicypraea mappa (KwaZulu-Natal and Mozambique))
- Cypraea marginalis Dillwyn, 1827 (Jeffreys Bay and north) (syn. Erosaria marginalis (KwaZulu-Natal and Mozambique))
- Cypraea mauritiana Linnaeus, 1758 (Park Rynie and north)
- Cypraea minoridens Melvill, 1901 (Port Alfred and north)
- Money cowrie Cypraea moneta Linnaeus, 1758 (Transkei to Mozambique) (Durban and north)
- Cypraea nucleus Linnaeus, 1758 (Scottburgh and north) (syn. Staphylaea nucleus (KwaZulu-Natal and Mozambique))
- Cypraea onyx Linnaeus, 1758 (Algoa Bay and north)
- Cypraea owenii Sowerby II, 1837 (Coffee Bay and north) (syn. Bistolida owenii vasta (Wild Coast to Mozambique))
- Cypraea poraria Linnaeus, 1758 (Durban and north)
- Cypraea punctata Linnaeus, 1758 (Durban and north)
- Cypraea scurra Gmelin, 1791 (Scottburgh and north) (syn. Mauritia scurra (KwaZulu-Natal and Mozambique))
- Stippled cowrie Cypraea staphylaea Linnaeus, 1758 (Mngazana to Mozambique)
- Cypraea stolida Linnaeus, 1758 (Scottburgh and north) (syn. Bistolida stolida diauges (KwaZulu-Natal and Mozambique))
- Cypraea talpa Linnaeus, 1758 (Park Rynie and north) (syn. Talparia talpa (Northern Wild Coast to Mozambique))
- Cypraea teres Gmelin, 1791 (Jeffreys Bay and north)
- Tiger cowrie Cypraea tigris Linnaeus, 1758 (Transkei to Mozambique) (Algoa Bay and north) (More common in Mozambique, where it occurs intertidally)
- Cypraea verhoefi Burgess, 1982 (Cape Agulhas and north/(east?))
- Cypraea vitellus Linnaeus, 1758 (Algoa Bay and north)
- Cypraea ziczac Linnaeus, 1758 (Nthlonyane and north)
- Cypraeovula castanea (Higgins, 1868) (False Bay to East London)
  - Cypraeovula castanea latebrosa Swarts & Liltved, 2000 (Cape St. Francis area)
- Cypraeovula cruickshanki (Kilburn, 1972) (Durban to off KwaZulu-Natal)
- Cypraeovula immelmani Liltved, 2001 (Southern Wild Coast)
- Cypraeovula mikeharti Lorentz, 1985 (Cape Point to Hermanus)
- Cypraeovula volvens Fazzini & Bergonzoni, 2004 (Port Alfred area)
- Erosia ocellata (Linnaeus, 1758) (KwaZulu-Natal and Mozambique)
- Erronea chinensis (Gmelin, 1791) (Jeffreys Bay to Mozambique)
- Erronea succinata (Lamarck, 1810) (Northern KwaZulu-Natal and Mozambique)

Ovulidae

- Calpurnus lacteus (Lamarck, 1810) (Mapella Rocks and north)
- Calpurnus verrucosus (Linnaeus, 1758) (Sodwana Bay and Mozambique)
- Crenavolva azumai (Cate, 1970) (Green Point (Southern KwaZulu-Natal) and north)
- Crenavolva draperi Cate and Azuma, 1973 (Jeffreys Bay and north)
- Crenavolva rosewateri Cate, 1973 (Jeffreys Bay and north)
- Crenavolva septemmacula (Azuma, 1974) (Gobey's Point (KwaZulu-Natal) and north)
- Crenavolva striatula (Sowerby I, 1828) (Park Rynie and north)
- Cymbovula deflexa (Sowerby II, 1848) (Sodwana Bay and north)
- Cymbovula segaliana Cate, 1976 (Anerley (Southern KwaZulu-Natal) and north)
- Dentiovula eizoi Cate and Azuma, 1973 (Boteler point (Northern KwaZulu-Natal and north)
- Galeravolva aenigma (Azuma and Cate, 1971) (Leifeldt's Rocks (northern KwaZulu-Natal) and north)
- Margovula pyriformis (Sowerby I, 1828) (Southern KwaZulu-Natal and north)
- Margovula schilderorum Cate, 1973 (Leven Point (northern KwaZulu-Natal and north)
- Margovula sp. cf. Margovula tinctilis Cate, 1973 (Park Rynie and north)
- Ovula costellata Lamarck, 1810 (Sodwana Bay and Mozambique)
- Ovula ovum (Linnaeus, 1758) (Sodwana Bay and Mozambiqueh)
- Phenacovolva aurantia (Sowerby III, 1889) (Jeffrey's Bay to KwaZulu-Natal)
- Phenacovolva brevirostris (Shumacher, 1817) (Cape St. Francis to KwaZulu-Natal)
- Phenacovolva fusula Cate and Azuma, 1973 (Umhlanga Rocks and north)
- Phenacovolva gracillima (E.A. Smith, 1901) (Park Rynie and north)
- Phenacovolva hirasei (Pilsbry, 1913) (Reunion Rocks (central KwaZulu-Natal) and north)
- Phenacovolva honkakujiana (Kuroda 1928) (Amanzimtoti and north)
- Phenacovolva sp. cf. Phenacovolva lahainaensis (Cate, 1969) (Agulhas Bank and north/(east?))
- Phenacovolva longirostrata (Sowerby I, 1828) (Whale Rock (Transkei) to Mozambique)
- Phenacovolva recurva (G.B. Sowerby II in A. Adams & Reeve, 1848) (Ramsgate and north)
- Phenacovolva poppei (Fehse, 2000) (KwaZulu-Natal to Mozambique)
- Phenacovolva rehderi Cate, 1973 (Unspecified locality in KwaZulu Natal)
- Phenacovolva rosea (A. Adams, 1854) (Jeffrey's Bay to KwaZulu-Natal)
- Phenacovolva rugosa (Cate and Azuma, 1973) (Park Rynie and Mozambique)
- Phenacovolva weaveri Cate, 1973 (Whale Rock (Transkei) to KwaZulu-Natal)
- Primovula beckeri (Sowerby III, 1900) (Alphard Bank and north/(east?))
- Primovula diaphana Liltved, 1987 (Durnford Point (northern KwaZulu-Natal) and north)
- Primovula habui Cate, 1973 (Durban and north)
- Primovula santacarolinensis Cate, 1978 (Durban and north)
- Primovula singularis Cate, 1973 (Umzimbazi river mouth and north)
- Prosimnia semperi (Weinkauff, 1881) (Jeffreys Bay and north)
- Pseudocypraea adamsonii (Sowerby II, 1832) (Southern KwaZulu-Natal)
- Pseudosimnia jeanae Cate, 1973 (Port Alfred and north)
- Serratovolva minabeensis Cate, 1975 (Richards Bay and north)
- Testudovolva pulchella (H. Adams, 1873) (Durban and north)
- Volva kilburni Cate, 1975 (Gonubie to KwaZulu-Natal)
- Volva volva Linnaeus, 1758 (Pumila (southern KwaZulu-Natal) to Mozambique)
- Xandarovula formosana (Azuma, 1972) (Danger Point to central KwaZulu-Natal)
- Pedicularia elegantissima Deshayes, 1863 (Cape St. Blaize and north)

Velutinidae

- Coriocella nigra Blainville, 1824: Port Elizabeth and north and Wild Coast to Mozambique.
- Lamellaria capensis (Bergh, 1907): Cape Point and north (?).
- Lamellaria leptoconcha (Bergh, 1907): Cape Point and north (?).
- Lamellaria perspicua (Linnaeus, 1758): Cape Point and north (?).

Triviidae - Trivia

- Alaerato gallinacea (Hinds, 1844): Kei river mouth and north.
- Cleotrivia globosa (Sowerby II, 1832): Port Alfred and north.
- Dolichupis producta (Gaskoin, 1836): Leven Point (KwaZulu-Natal) north.
- Eratoena sulcifera (Sowerby I, 1832): Jeffreys Bay and north.
- Quasipusula vemacola (Liltved, 1987): Vema seamount, South Atlantic.
- Semitrivia hallucinata (Liltved, 1984): Ledsman shoal [northern KwaZulu-Natal] and north.
- Sulcerato recondita (Melvill and Standen, 1903): East London and north.
- Trivellona suavis (Schilder, 1931): Cape Agulhas and north (?).
- Baby's toes Triviella aperta (Swainson, 1822): Cape Agulhas to Transkei.
- Trivia sp. cf. Trivella aperta (Swainson, 1822): East London and north.
- Triviella calvariola (Kilburn, 1980): Cape Agulhas to Great Fish Point.
- Trivia sp. cf. Triviella calvariola Kilburn, 1980: Cape St. Blaize and north.
- Triviella costata (Gmelin, 1791): Cape Agulhas and north (?).
- Triviella eratoides (Liltved 1986): Cape St. Blaize and north.
- Triviella khanya (Liltved, 1986): Cape St. Blaize to East London.
- Triviella lemaitrei (Liltved, 1986): Cape St. Blaize and north.
- Triviella magnidentata (Liltved, 1986):: Cape Town to East London.
- West coast baby's toes Triviella millardi (Cate, 1979): Cape west coast and Cape Agulhas and north.
- Triviella multicostata (Liltved, 1986): Cape St. Blaize and north.
- Triviella neglecta Schilder, 1930: Cape Peninsula, Cape Agulhas and north (?).
- Baby's toes Triviella ovulata (Lamarck, 1810): Cape Point to south Transkei.
- Triviella phalacra Schilder, 1930: Cape St. Francis to East London.
- Triviella rubra (Shaw, 1909): Cape Agulhas to Kei River Mouth.
- Triviella sanctispiritus (Shikama, 1974): Cape Town to East London.
- Triviella splendidissima Tomlin and Schilder, 1934: Cape Morgan (Eastern Cape) and north.
- Triviella verhoefi (Gosliner and Liltved, 1981): Cape Agulhas and north (?).
- Triviella vesicularis (Gaskoin, 1836): Cape St. Blaize and north. Cape Agulhas and north (?).
- Trivirostra oryza (Lamarck, 1810): Port Alfred to KwaZulu-Natal.
- Trivirostra hordacea (Kiener, 1843): Coffee Bay and north.
- Tear drops or Riceys Trivirostra pellucidula (Reeve, 1846): Jeffreys Bay to Mozambique.

Naticidae - Necklace shells

- Eunaticina perobliqua (Dautzenberg & Fischer, 1906) (KwaZulu-Natal and Mozambique)
- Euspira napus (E.A. Smith, 1904) (Mossel Bay to East London)
- Mammilla fibrosa (Eydoux & Souleyet, 1852) (Mozambique)
- Comma necklace shell Notocochlis gualteriana Récluz, 1844. (Syn. Natica gualteriana) (Eastern Cape to Mozambique)
- Natica lineata (Roding, 1798) (KwaZulu-Natal and Mozambique)
- Mottled necklace shell Natica tecta Anton, 1839 (Namibia to Eastern Cape)
- Naticarius alapapilionis (Roding, 1798) (northern Wild Coast to Mozambique)
- Naticarius manceli (Josseaume, 1874) (northern KwaZulu-Natal to Mozambique)
- Naticarius onca (Roding, 1798) (northern KwaZulu-Natal to Mozambique)
- Neverita albumen (Linnaeus, 1758) (Durban to Mozambique)
- Neverita perselephanti (Link, 1807) (KwaZulu-Natal to Mozambique)
- Moon shell Polinices didyma Röding, 1798 (Mossel Bay to Mozambique)
- Polinices mammilla Linnaeus 1758 (Transkei to Mozambique)
- Polinices paciae Bozzetti, 1997 (Northern KwaZulu-Natal and Mozambique)
- Polinices sebae (Recluz, 1844) (KwaZulu-Natal to Mozambique)
- Polinices simiae (Deshayes, 1838) (Wild Coast to Mozambique)
- Polinices syrphetodes (Kilburn, 1976) (KwaZulu-Natal to Mozambique)
- Sinum delessertii (Recluz, 1843) (KwaZulu-Natal and Mozambique)
- Sinum haliotoideum (Linnaeus, 1758) (KwaZulu-Natal and Mozambique)
- Sinum laevigatum (Lamarck, 1822) (Durban to Mozambique)
- Sinum quasimodoides Kilburn, 1976 (Northern KwaZulu-Natal to Mozambique)
- Tanea euzona (Recluz, 1844) (KwaZulu-Natal and Mozambique)
- Tanea hilaris (Sowerby, 1914) (KwaZulu-Natal and Mozambique)
- Tectonatica violacea (Sowerby, 1825) (Northern KwaZulu-Natal and Mozambique)

Tonnidae - Tonninae

- Tonna berthae Vos, 2005

Tonnidae - Cassinae - Helmet shells

- Pustular triton Argobuccinum pustulosum Lightfoot, 1786 (Orange River to Eastern Cape)
- Casmaria decipiens (Kilburn, 1980) (Wild Coast to central KwaZulu-Natal)
- Casmaria erinaceus (Linnaeus, 1758) (KwaZulu-Natal and Mozambique)
- Casmaria ponderosa (Gmelin, 1791) (Northern KwaZulu-Natal and Mozambique)
- Cassis cornuta (Linnaeus, 1758) (Northern KwaZulu-Natal and Mozambique)
- Cypraecassis rufa (Linnaeus, 1758) (Northern KwaZulu-Natal and Mozambique)
- Galeodea keyteri (Kilburn, 1975) (Northern KwaZulu-Natal and Mozambique)
- Oocorys lussii Bozzetti, 1990 (central KwaZulu-Natal)
- Oocorys sulcata Fischer, 1883 (eastern seaboard of South Africa and Mozambique)
- Checkerboard bonnet shell Phalium areola (Linnaeus, 1758) (KwaZulu-Natal and Mozambique)
- Phalium fimbria (Gmelin, 1791) (Northern KwaZulu-Natal and Mozambique)
- Phalium glaucum (Linnaeus, 1758) (KwaZulu-Natal and Mozambique)
- Helmet shell Phalium labiatum zeylanicum Lamarck, 1822 (Cape Point to northern KwaZulu-Natal) (syn. Semicassis labiata zeylanica)
- Semicassis bisulcata (Schubert & Wagner, 1829) (KwaZulu-Natal and Mozambique)
- Semicassis bulla fernandesi (Kilburn, 1975) (Central KwaZulu-Natal and Mozambique)
- Semicassis craticulata (Euthyme, 1885) (Jeffreys Bay to Mozambique)
- Semicassis faurotis (Jousseaume, 1888) (Kwazulu-Natal and Mozambique)
- Semicassis faurotis (Jousseaume, 1888) (Kwazulu-Natal and Mozambique)
- Semicassis microstoma (von Martens, 1903) (Central Kwazulu-Natal to Mozambique)

Janthinidae - Violet shells

- Bubble raft shell or Violet snail Janthina janthina Linnaeus, 1758 (Cape Columbine to Mozambique)
- Janthina globosa Swainson, 1822 (syn. Janthina prolongata Blainville, 1822)
- Janthina pallida Thompson W., 1840
- Janthina exigua Lamarck, 1816
- Janthina umbilicata d'Orbigny, 1852

Bursidae

- Granular frog shell Dulcerana granularis Röding, 1798 (Transkei to Mozambique)

Ranellidae

- Pink lady Charonia lampas pustulata Euthyme, 1889 (Cape Point to Mozambique)
- Ranella australasia gemmifera Euthyme, 1889 (Cape Point to Durban)
- Ranella olearium (Linnaeus, 1758)
- Furry ridged triton Cabestana cutacea africana Adams A. 1855 (Namibia to southern Mozambique)

Muricidae

- Branched murex Chicoreus inflatus Lamarck, 1822. (Syn. Chicoreus ramosus) (Central KwaZulu-Natal to Mozambique)
- Mulberry shell Morula granulata Duclos, 1832 (Eastern Cape to Mozambique)
- Short-spined murex Murex brevispina Lamarck, 1822 (Central KwaZulu-Natal to Mozambique)
- Fenestrate oyster drill Ocenebra fenestrata Gould, 1833 (Cape Point to Transkei)
- Stag shell Pteropurpura (Poropteron) graagae (Coen, 1947) (Eastern Cape to northern KwaZulu-Natal)
- Pteropurpurea (Poropteron) uncinaria Lamarck, 1822 (Namibia to Port Alfred)
- Salmon lipped whelk Purpura persica Linnaeus, 1758 (Syn. Purpura panama) (Transkei to Mozambique)
- Thais bufo Lamarck 1822 (Transkei to Indo-Pacific)
- Thais (Mancinella) alouina Röding, 1798. (Syn. Mancinella alouina) (Transkei to Indo-Pacific)
- Knobbly dogwhelk Thais capensis Petit de la Saussaye, 1852 (Agulhas to central KwaZulu-Natal)
- Thais savignyi Deshayes, 1844 (Zululand to Indo-Pacific)
- Thais wahlbergi (Saldanha to False Bay)
- Girdled dogwhelk Nucella cingulata Linnaeus, 1771 (Orange river to Cape Point)
- Common dogwhelk Nucella dubia (Krauss, 1848) (Namibia to Transkei)
- Scaly dogwhelk Nucella squamosa (Lamarck, 1816) (Namibia to Transkei)

Buccinidae

- Flame-patterned burnupena Burnupena catarrhacta Gmelin, 1791 (Orange river to Agulhas)
- Ridged burnupena Burnupena cincta Röding, 1798 (Namibia to Transkei)
- Burnupena lagenaria Lamarck, 1822 (Saldanha to Zululand)
- Papery burnupena Burnupena papyracea Bruguière, 1792 (Orange river to Agulhas)
- Burnupena pubescens Küster, 1858 (North western Cape to Durban)
- Burnupena sp. (West coast)

Buccinidae - Photinae

- Elongate dogwhelk Afrocominella elongata Dunker, 1857

Fasciolariidae

- Fasciolaria lugubris
  - Fasciolaria lugubris heynemanni ( (Syn? Pleuroploca lugubris heynemanni (Dunker, R.W., 1876))
  - Fasciolaria lugubris lugubris (Saldanha to False Bay) (syn? Pleuroploca lugubris lugubris (Adams, A. & L.A. Reeve in Reeve, L.A., 1847))
- Long-siphoned whelk Fusinus ocelliferus Lamarck, 1816 (Namaqualand to central KwaZulu-Natal)
- Forsskal's whelk Peristernia forskalii (Tapparone-Canefri, C.E., 1879) (Eastern Cape to Mozambique)

Mitridae - Mitres

- Mitra litterata Lamarck, 1811 (West Transkei to Mozambique)
- Brown mitre Mitra picta Reeve, 1844 ((Cape Columbine to KwaZulu-Natal south coast)

Strombidae - Strombs

- Lambis chiragra arthritica Roding, 1798 (Northern KwaZulu-Natal to Mozambique)
- Lambis crocata crocata (Link, 1807) (Northern KwaZulu-Natal to Mozambique)
- Lambis digitata (Perry, 1811) (Northern KwaZulu-Natal to Mozambique)
- Lambis lambis (Linnaeus, 1758) (Northern KwaZulu-Natal and Mozambique)
- Lambis truncata truncata (Lightfoot, 1768) (Northern KwaZulu-Natal to Mozambique)
- Variable stromb Strombus mutabilis Swainson, 1821 (Eastern Cape to Mozambique)
- Strombus wilsonorum Abbott, 1967 (KwaZulu-Natal and Mozambique)

Aporrhaidae - pelican foot shells

- Aporrhais pesgallinae Barnard, 1963 (Namibia and Western Cape)

Nassariidae

Dogwhelks

- Nassarius albescens gemmuliferus (Adams, A., 1852) (Transkei northwards)
- Shielded dogwhelk Nassarius arcularius plicatus (Röding, P.F., 1798) (Central KwaZulu-Natal to Mozambique)
- Cape dogwhelk Nassarius capensis R. W. Dunker, 1846 (Cape Columbine to Transkei)
- Nassarius coronatus (Bruguière, J.G., 1789) (Durban northwards)
- Tick shell Nassarius kraussianus (Dunker, R.W., 1846) (Namaqualand to Mozambique)
- Lattice dogwhelk Nassarius plicatellus (Adams, A., 1852) (Namibia to Cape Columbine)
- Purple-lipped dogwhelk Nassarius speciosus (Adams, A., 1852) (Orange river to Transkei)

Plough shells

- Annulated plough shell Bullia annulata Lamarck, 1816 (Cape Columbine to Mozambique)
- Bullia callosa Gray, 1828 (Mossel Bay to KwaZulu-Natal north coast)
- Finger plough shell Bullia digitalis (Dillwyn, L.W., 1817) (Namibia to Transkei)
- Fat plough shell Bullia laevissima (Gmelin, 1791) (Namibia to Transkei)
- Bullia mozambicensis E. A. Smith, 1878 (KwaZulu-Natal south coast to Mozambique)
- Pleated plough shell Bullia natalensis Krauss, C.F., 1848 (Transkei to Mozambique)
- Pure plough shell Bullia pura Melvill, J.C., 1885 (Cape Point to central KwaZulu-Natal)
- Smooth plough shell Bullia rhodostoma Reeve, L.A., 1847 (Cape Point to North KwaZulu-Natal)

Olividae - Olive shells

- Carolinian olive shell Oliva caroliniana Duclos, 1835 (Transkei to Mozambique)

Marginellidae - Marginellas

- Marginella musica Hinds, 1844 (Luderitz to Cape Agulhas)
- Cloudy marginella Marginella nebulosa Bolten in Röding, P.F., 1798 (Cape Point to Eastern Cape)
- Ornate marginella Marginella ornata Redfield, J.H., 1870 (Port Elizabeth to Transkei)
- Sandy marginella Marginella piperata Hinds, 1844 (Cape Point to KwaZulu-Natal north coast)
- Pinch lipped marginella Marginella rosea Lamarck, 1822 (Cape Columbine to Cape Agulhas)
- Cape marginella Volvarina capensis Krauss, 1848 (Namibia to Cape Hangklip)
- Banded volvarina or Banded marginella Volvarina zonata (Kiener, 1841) (Saldanha Bay to Port Elizabeth)

Conidae - Cone shells

- Algoa cone Conus algoensis G. B. Sowerby II, 1834 (Cape Columbine to Cape Agulhas)
  - Conus algoensis algoensis (West coast))
  - Yellow Algoa cone Conus algoensis simplex G. B. Sowerby II, 1858 (Cape Point to Hermanus))
  - Conus algoensis scitulus (Hermanus to Cape Agulhas))
- Hebrew cone Conus ebraeus Linnaeus, 1758 (Transkei to Mozambique)
- Livid cone Conus lividus Hwass in Bruguière, 1792 (Transkei to Mozambique)
- Elongate cone Conus mozambicus Hwass in Bruguière, 1792 (Orange river to Eastern Cape)
- Natal textile cone Conus natalis Sowerby II, 1857 (Eastern Cape to central KwaZulu-Natal)
- Sponsal cone Conus sponsalis Hwass in Bruguière, 1792 (Transkei to Mozambique)
- Textile cone Conus textile Linnaeus, 1758 (Natal northwards)
- Variable cone Conus tinianus Hwass in Bruguière, 1792 (Agulhas to Transkei)

Cancellariidae

- Admetula afra Petit & Harasewych, 2000
- Admetula epula Petit & Harasewych, 1991
- Trigonostoma kilburni Petit & Harasewych, 2000
- Nipponaphera wallacei Petit & Harasewych, 2000
- Zeadmete verheckeni Petit & Harasewych, 2000

=== Heterobranchia — Heterobranch gastropods ===
See article List of marine heterobranch gastropods of South Africa
