= C. africanum =

C. africanum may refer to:

- Calliostoma africanum, a sea snail species
- Capnophyllum africanum, a flowering plant species endemic to southern Africa
- Cyclamen africanum, the African cyclamen, a perennial plant species native to northern Algeria and Tunisia
