= Trigonostoma kilburni =

Scientific classification
- Kingdom: Animalia
- Phylum: Mollusca
- Class: Gastropoda
- Subclass: Caenogastropoda
- Order: Neogastropoda
- Family: Cancellariidae
- Genus: Trigonostoma
- Species: T. kilburni

Binomial name
- Trigonostoma kilburni Petit & Harasewych, 2000

Species of gastropod

Trigonostoma kilburni is a species of sea snail, a marine gastropod mollusc in the family Cancellariidae, the nutmeg snails.

The specific name kilburni is in honor of South African malacologist Richard Neil Kilburn.

== Distribution ==
South Africa.
