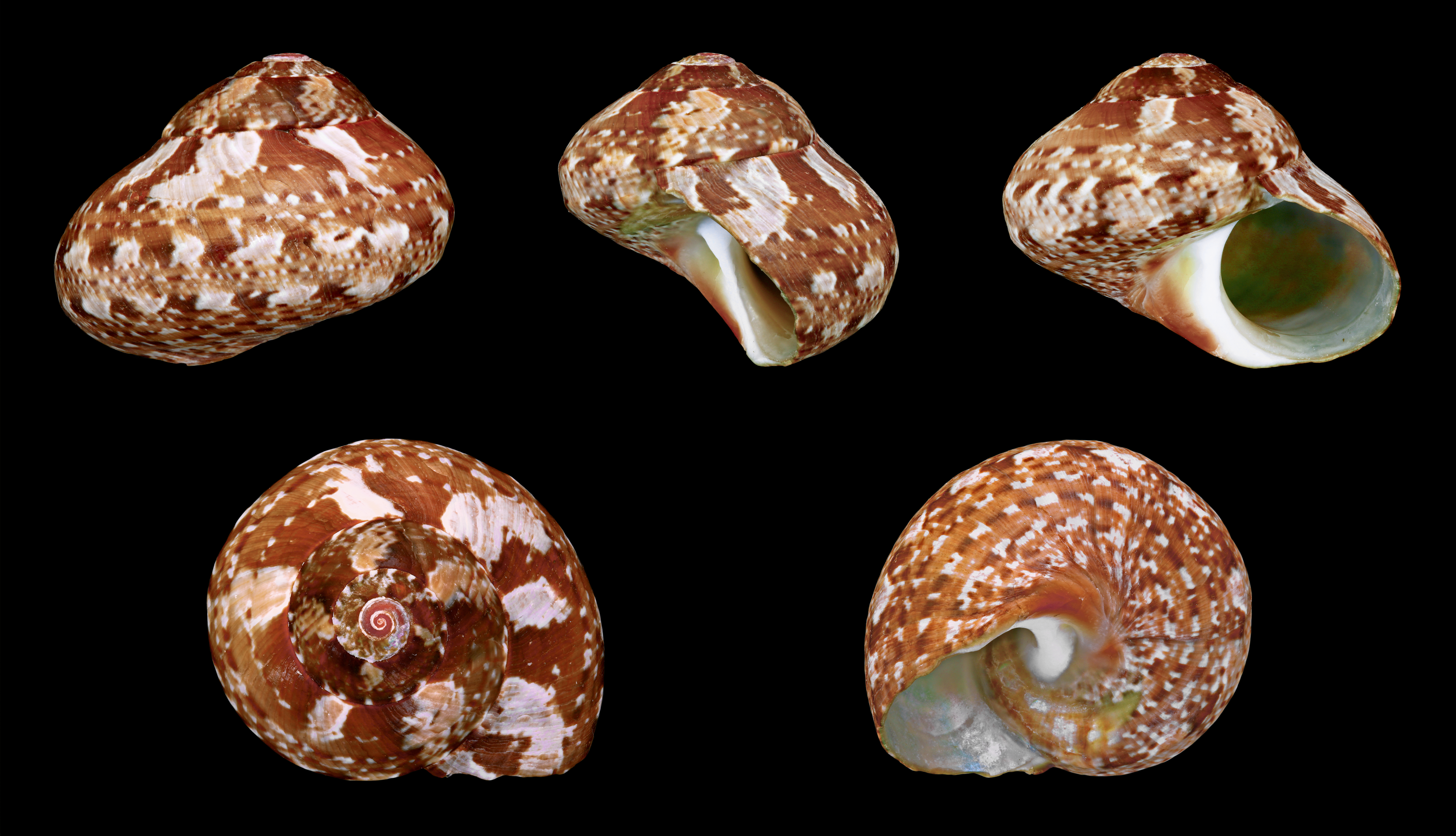

Scientific classification
- Kingdom: Animalia
- Phylum: Mollusca
- Class: Gastropoda
- Subclass: Vetigastropoda
- Order: Trochida
- Family: Turbinidae
- Genus: Turbo
- Species: T. cidaris

Binomial name
- Turbo cidaris Gmelin, 1791

Synonyms
- Liotia fulgens Gould, A.A., 1859; Turbo anomala Röding, P.F., 1798; Turbo (Ocana) cidaris Gmelin, 1791; Turbo natalensis C. F. Krauss, 1848; Turbo tricarinulatus Euthyme; Turbo (Sarmaticus) cidaris cidaris Gmelin, 1791

= Turbo cidaris =

Species of gastropod

Turbo cidaris, common name the crown turban, is a species of sea snail, marine gastropod mollusk in the family Turbinidae.

Some authors place the name in the subgenus Turbo (Sarmaticus)

Subspecies

- Turbo cidaris cidaris Gmelin, 1791
- Turbo cidaris natalensis (Krauss, 1848) (synonyms: Turbo natalensis Krauss, 1848; Turbo natalensis var. unicolor Turton, 1932)

== Description ==
The length of the shell varies between 25 mm and 60 mm. The imperforate, smooth and polished shell has a depressed, heliciform shape. Its color pattern is reddish, brown or yellow, usually flammulated above, variously marked below, with white. The spire is short and contains 5–6 whorls. The upper ones are bicarinate, the last often considerably descending, and rounded. The aperture is circular, oblique, and white within, rounded below. The wide columella is callous, and is excavated at the umbilical region.

The operculum is slightly concave inside, with six whorls and a subcentral apex. The outer surface is sharply granulate, white, convex, spiral, with a central pit.

== Distribution ==
This species occurs in the Indian Ocean off Mozambique and South Africa. It has also been found off Angola and Indonesia.
