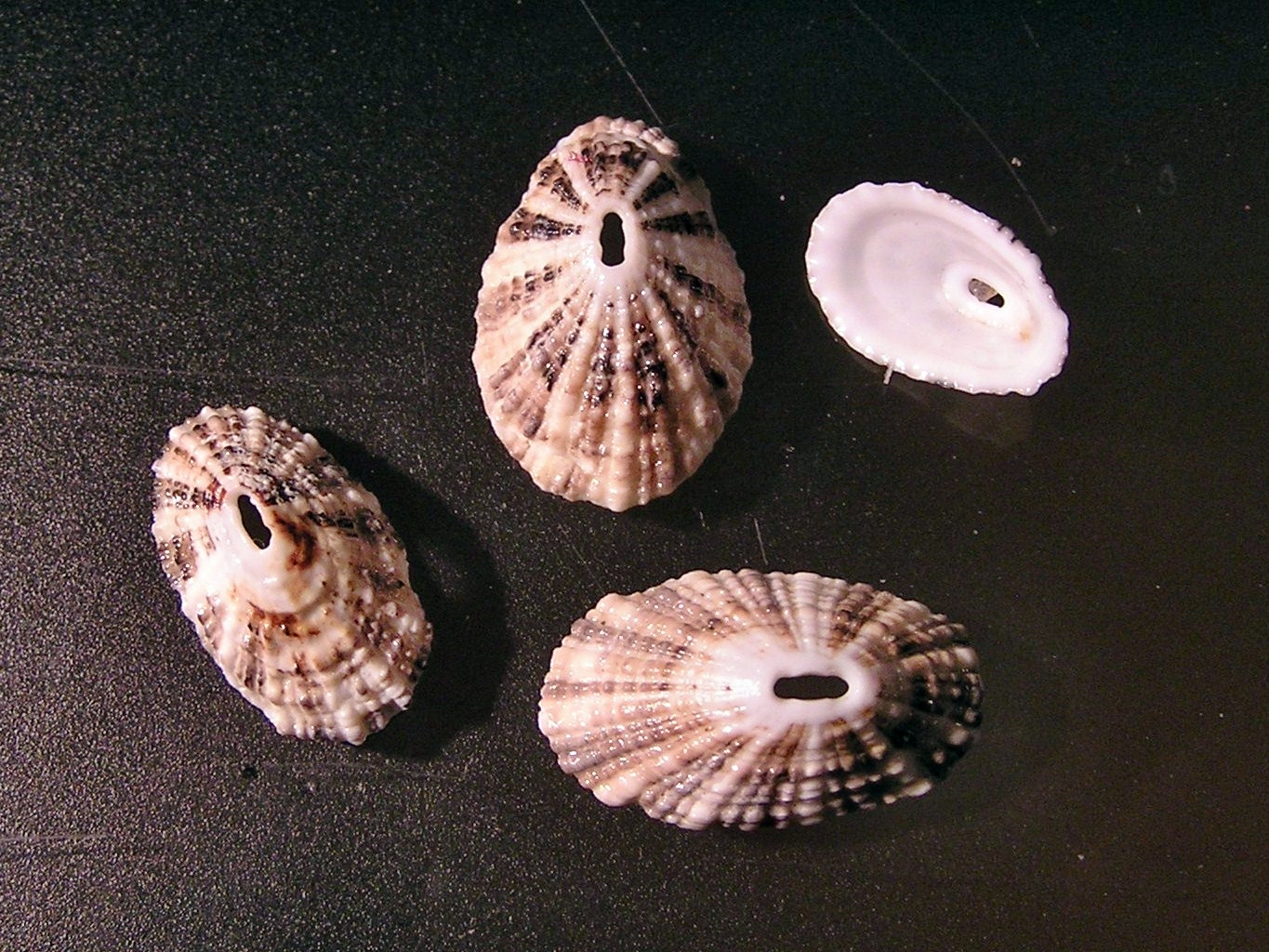

Scientific classification
- Kingdom: Animalia
- Phylum: Mollusca
- Class: Gastropoda
- Subclass: Vetigastropoda
- Order: Lepetellida
- Family: Fissurellidae
- Genus: Fissurella
- Species: F. natalensis

Binomial name
- Fissurella natalensis Krauss, 1848

Synonyms
- Diodora natalensis (Krauss, 1848)

= Fissurella natalensis =

Species of gastropod

Fissurella natalensis is a species of sea snail, a marine gastropod mollusk in the family Fissurellidae, the keyhole limpets.

== Distribution ==
This species occurs in the Indian Ocean off Madagascar, Mozambique and South Africa.
