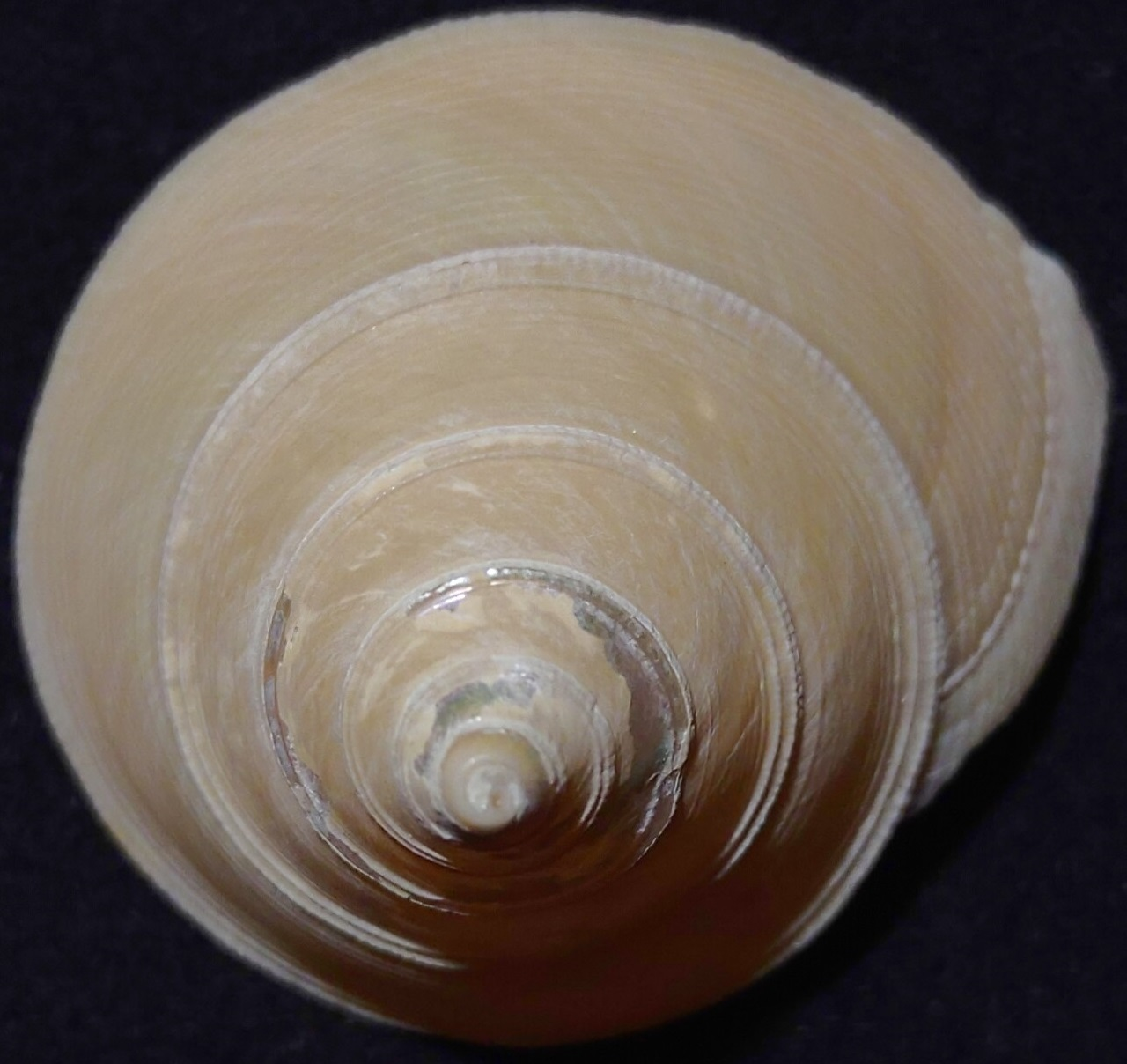

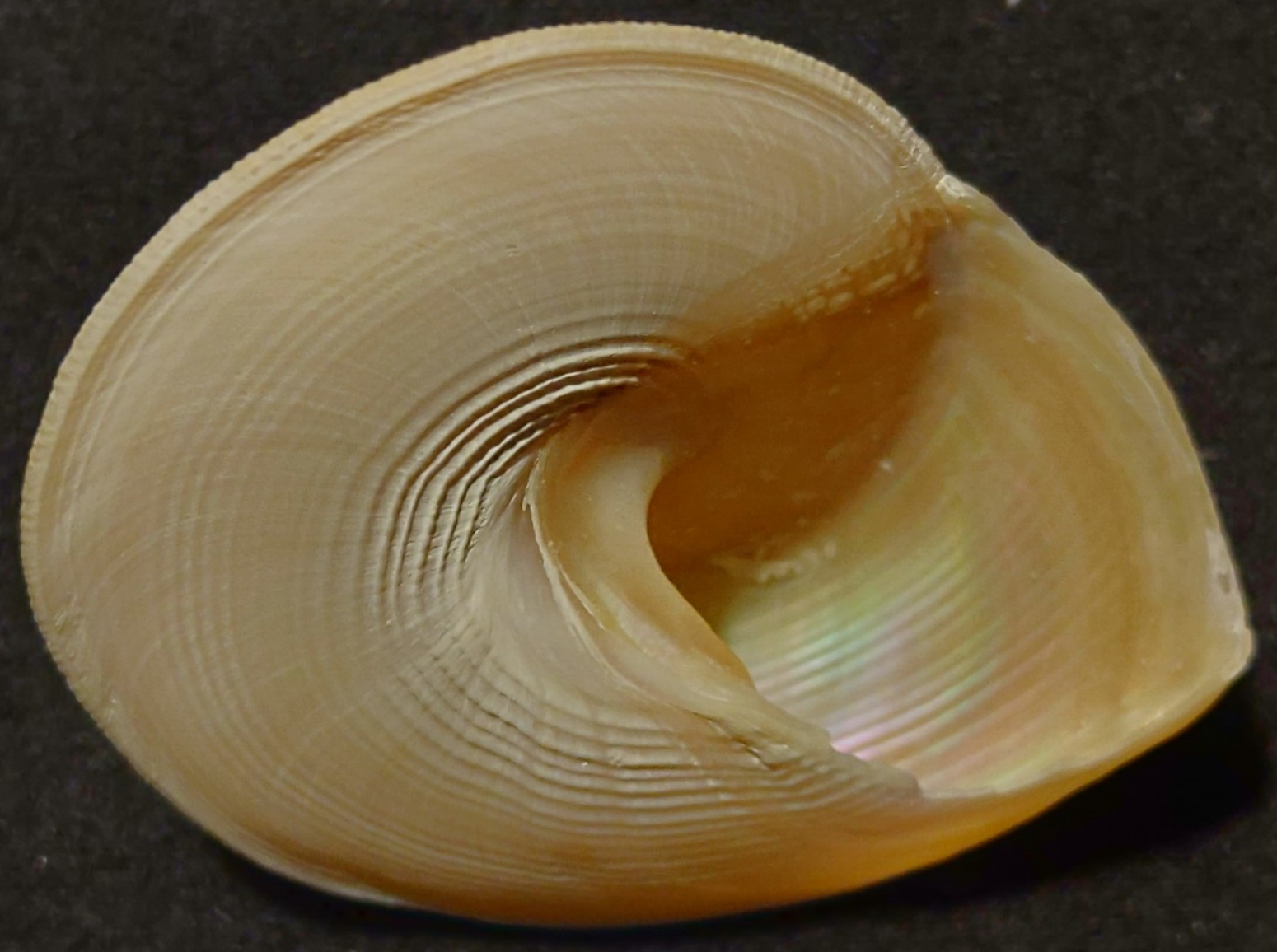

Scientific classification
- Kingdom: Animalia
- Phylum: Mollusca
- Class: Gastropoda
- Subclass: Vetigastropoda
- Order: Trochida
- Family: Calliostomatidae
- Genus: Calliostoma
- Species: C. scotti

Binomial name
- Calliostoma scotti Kilburn, 1973

Synonyms
- Calliostoma (Kombologion) scotti Kilburn, 1973

= Calliostoma scotti =

Species of gastropod

Calliostoma scotti, common name Scott's top shell, is a species of sea snail, a marine gastropod mollusk in the family Calliostomatidae.

Some authors place this taxon in the subgenus Calliostoma (Kombologion)

== Description ==
The size of the shell varies between 25 mm and 40 mm.

== Distribution ==
This species occurs in the Indian Ocean between Somalia and South Africa.
