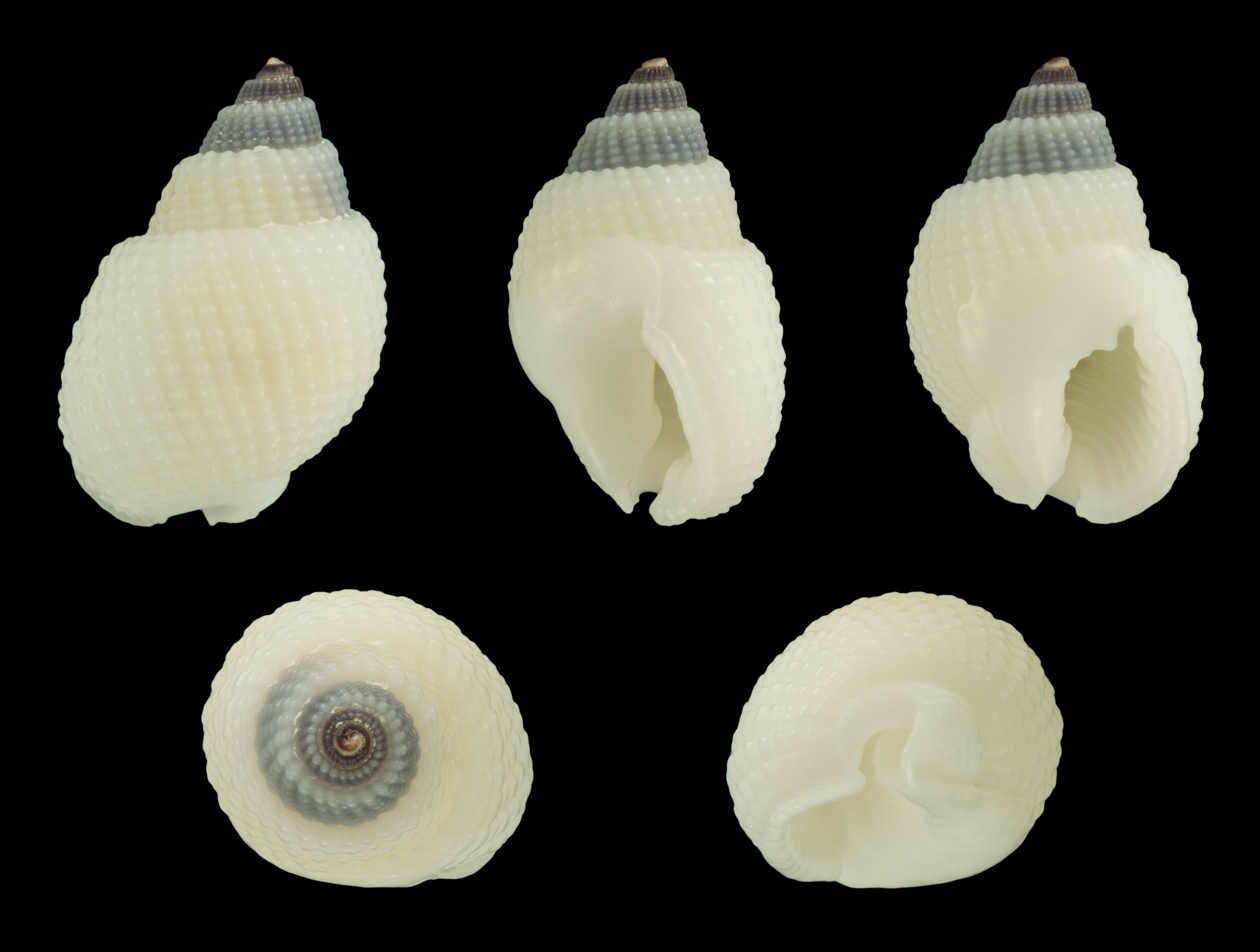
- Shell of Nassarius albescens

Scientific classification
- Kingdom: Animalia
- Phylum: Mollusca
- Class: Gastropoda
- Subclass: Caenogastropoda
- Order: Neogastropoda
- Family: Nassariidae
- Genus: Nassarius
- Species: N. albescens

Binomial name
- Nassarius albescens (Dunker, 1846)

Synonyms
- Buccinum albescens Dunker, 1846; Nassa (Niotha) albescens (Dunker, 1846); Nassa (Niotha) reicosa A. Adams, 1852; Nassa adamsiana Marrat, 1880; Nassa albescens (Dunker, 1846); Nassa baguenai Giner Mari, 1934; Nassa bicolor Hombron & Jacquinot, 1848; Nassa retecosa Adams, A., 1852; Nassarius (Niotha) albescens (Dunker, 1846); Nassarius (Niotha) albescens albescens (Dunker, 1846); Nassarius albescens albescens (Dunker, 1846)

= Nassarius albescens =

Species of gastropod

Nassarius albescens, common name : the whitish nassa, is a species of sea snail, a marine gastropod mollusc in the family Nassariidae, the Nassa mud snails or dog whelks.

The subspecies : Nassarius albescens gemmuliferus (A. Adams, 1852) is a synonym of Nassarius gemmuliferus (A. Adams, 1852) ) (synonyms : Nassa (Niotha) albescens var. fenestratus (Marrat, 1877); Nassa (Niotha) fenestrata (Marrat, 1877); Nassa fenestrata Marratt, 1877; Nassa gemmulifera A. Adams, 1852; Nassa isabellei Reeve, 1853; Nassarius (Niotha) albescens gemmuliferus (A. Adams, 1852); Nassarius (Niotha) fenestratus (Marrat, 1877); Nassarius (Niotha) fenestratus var. gestroi Bisacchi, 1930; Nassarius fenestratus (Marratt, 1877);

== Description ==
The length of the shell varies between 9 mm and 25 mm. Its surface sculpture has a distinctive fine network of evenly spaced nodules. The columella is narrow or wide. The overall colour of the shell is creamy white while the aperture is brown.

== Distribution ==
This species is distributed in the Indian Ocean off Madagascar and in the Pacific Ocean off the Philippines and Australia; also reaching Japan.
