= Diodora parviforata =

Scientific classification
- Kingdom: Animalia
- Phylum: Mollusca
- Class: Gastropoda
- Subclass: Vetigastropoda
- Order: Lepetellida
- Family: Fissurellidae
- Genus: Diodora
- Species: D. parviforata

Binomial name
- Diodora parviforata (Sowerby III, 1889)

Synonyms
- Fissurella parviforata Sowerby III, 1889

Species of gastropod

Diodora parviforata, common name the conical keyhole limpet, is a species of sea snail, a marine gastropod mollusk in the family Fissurellidae, the keyhole limpets.
