= Marginella piperata =

Scientific classification
- Kingdom: Animalia
- Phylum: Mollusca
- Class: Gastropoda
- Subclass: Caenogastropoda
- Order: Neogastropoda
- Family: Marginellidae
- Genus: Marginella
- Species: M. piperata

Binomial name
- Marginella piperata Hinds 1844

Species of gastropod

Marginella piperata is a species of sea snail, a marine gastropod mollusk in the family Marginellidae, the margin snails.

== Subspecies ==
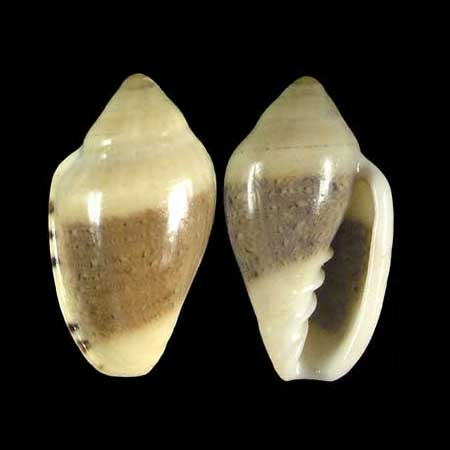
M. piperata albocincta

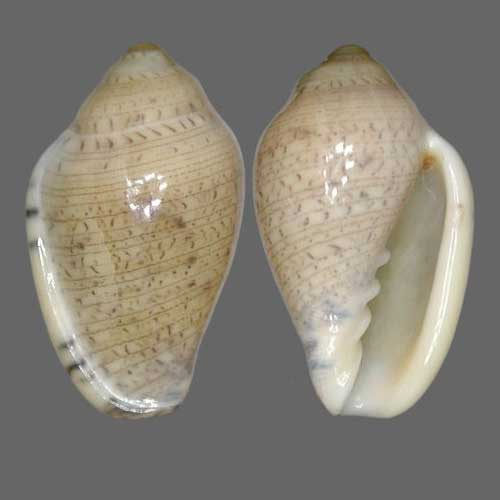
M. piperata lutea

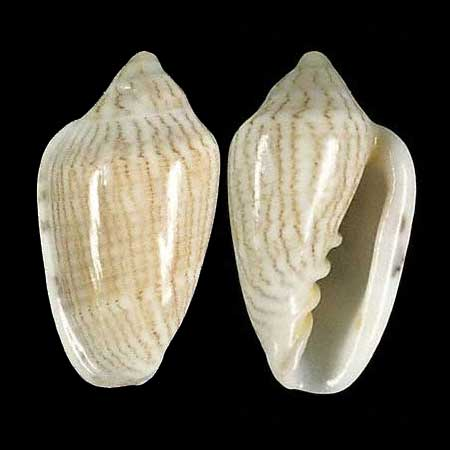
M. piperata strigata

- Subspecies Marginella piperata albocincta Sowerby, 1846]
- Subspecies Marginella piperata fuscopicta Turton, 1932
- Subspecies Marginella piperata lutea Sowerby III, 1889
- Subspecies Marginella piperata monozona Turton, 1932
- Subspecies Marginella piperata strigata Sowerby III, 1889
