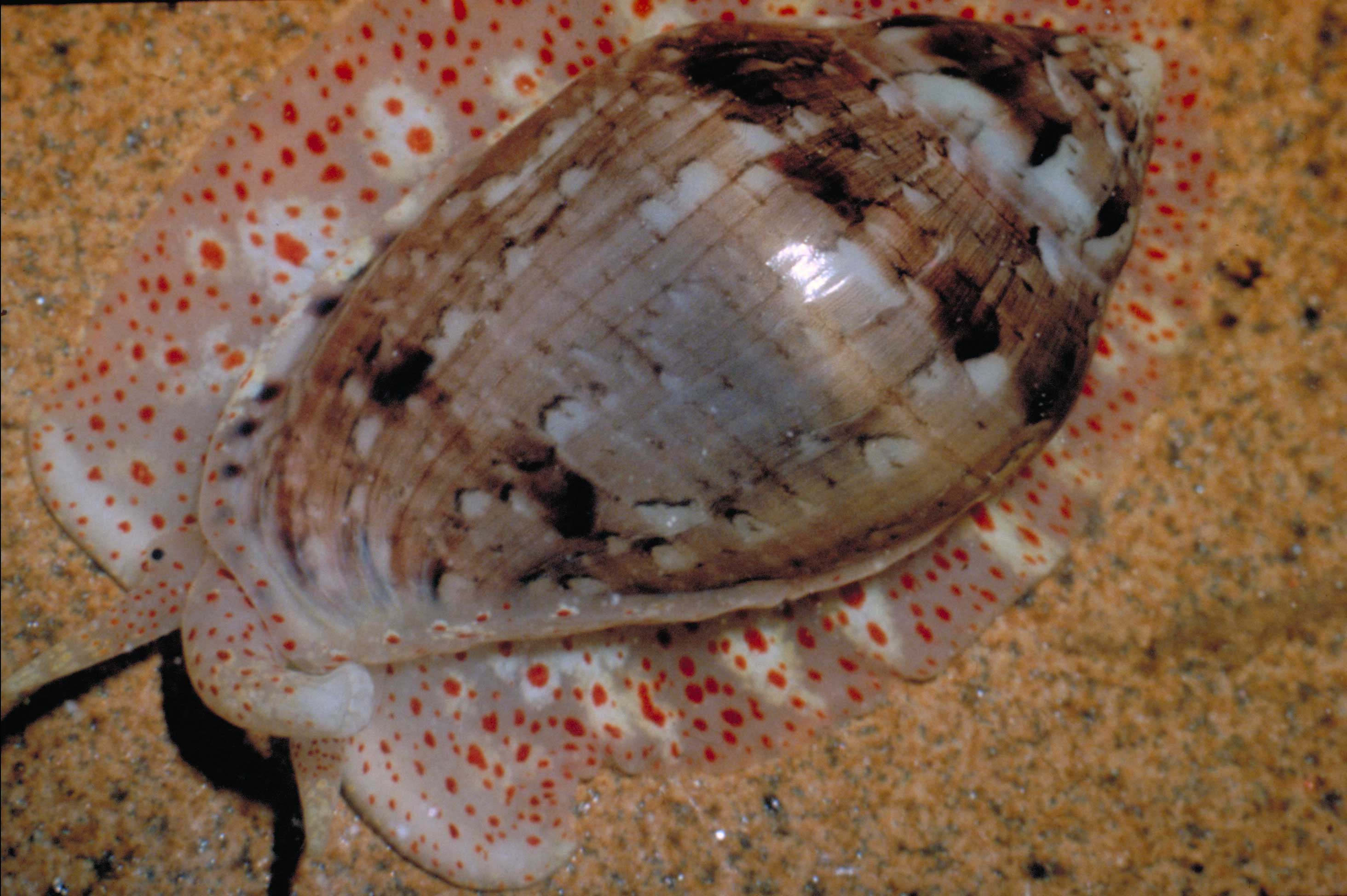
- A live individual of Marginella rosea

Scientific classification
- Kingdom: Animalia
- Phylum: Mollusca
- Class: Gastropoda
- Subclass: Caenogastropoda
- Order: Neogastropoda
- Family: Marginellidae
- Genus: Marginella
- Species: M. rosea

Binomial name
- Marginella rosea Lamarck, 1822

= Marginella rosea =

Species of gastropod

Marginella rosea is a species of sea snail, a marine gastropod mollusk in the family Marginellidae, the margin snails.

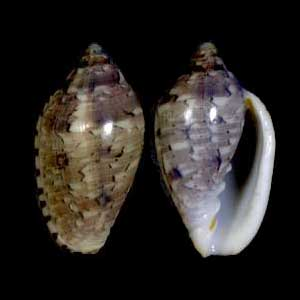
Two views of a shell of Marginella rosea
