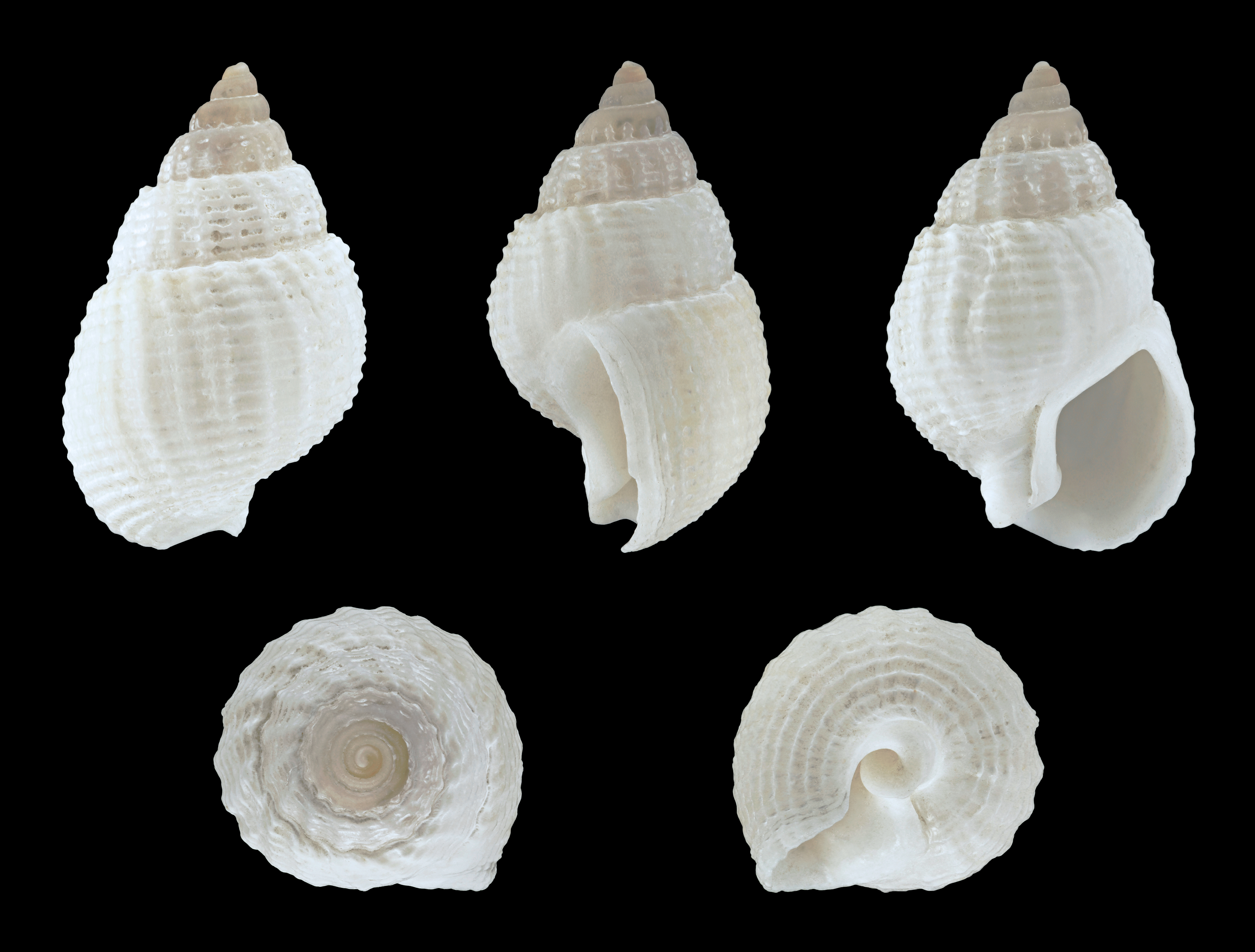

Scientific classification
- Kingdom: Animalia
- Phylum: Mollusca
- Class: Gastropoda
- Subclass: Caenogastropoda
- Order: Neogastropoda
- Family: Nassariidae
- Genus: Nassarius
- Species: N. niveus

Binomial name
- Nassarius niveus (A. Adams, 1852)

Synonyms
- Nassa (Caesia) plicatella A. Adams, 1852; Nassa (Tritia) nivea A. Adams, 1852; Nassa (Tritia) plicatella A. Adams, 1852; Nassa nivea A. Adams, 1852 (basionym); Nassa plicatella A. Adams, 1852 (Invalid: junior homonym of Nassa plicatella Münster, 1835); Nassa scopularca Barnard, 1959; Nassarius (Zeuxis) plicatellus (A. Adams, 1852); Nassarius plicatellus (A. Adams, 1852)

= Nassarius niveus =

Species of gastropod

Nassarius niveus, common name the lattice dogwhelk, is a species of sea snail, a marine gastropod mollusk in the family Nassariidae, the Nassa mud snails or dog whelks.

== Description ==
The shell size varies between 15 mm and 25 mm.

== Distribution ==
This species occurs in the Atlantic Ocean off Angola, Namibia and the west coast of South Africa.
