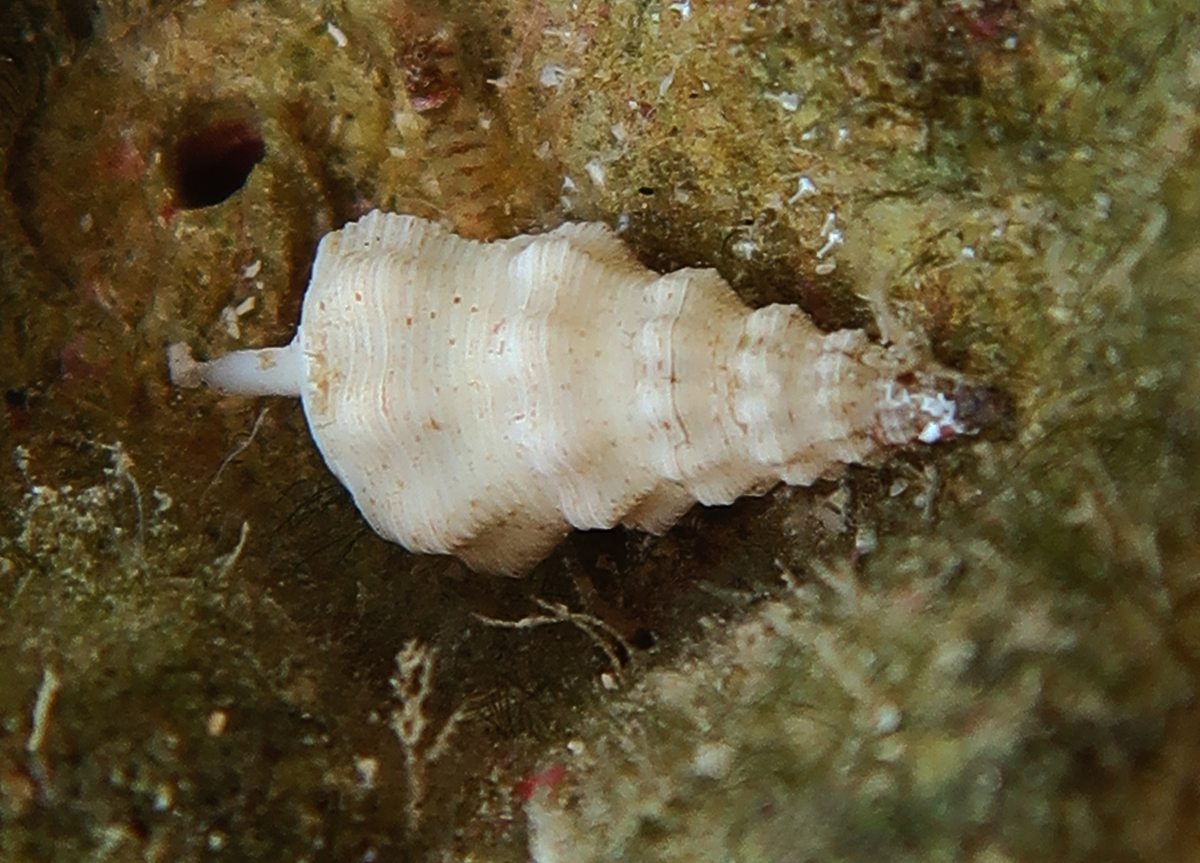
- Cerithium citrinum shell

Scientific classification
- Kingdom: Animalia
- Phylum: Mollusca
- Class: Gastropoda
- Subclass: Caenogastropoda
- Order: incertae sedis
- Family: Cerithiidae
- Genus: Cerithium
- Species: C. citrinum

Binomial name
- Cerithium citrinum G.B. Sowerby II, 1855

= Cerithium citrinum =

Species of gastropod

Cerithium citrinum is a species of sea snail, a marine gastropod mollusk in the family Cerithiidae.

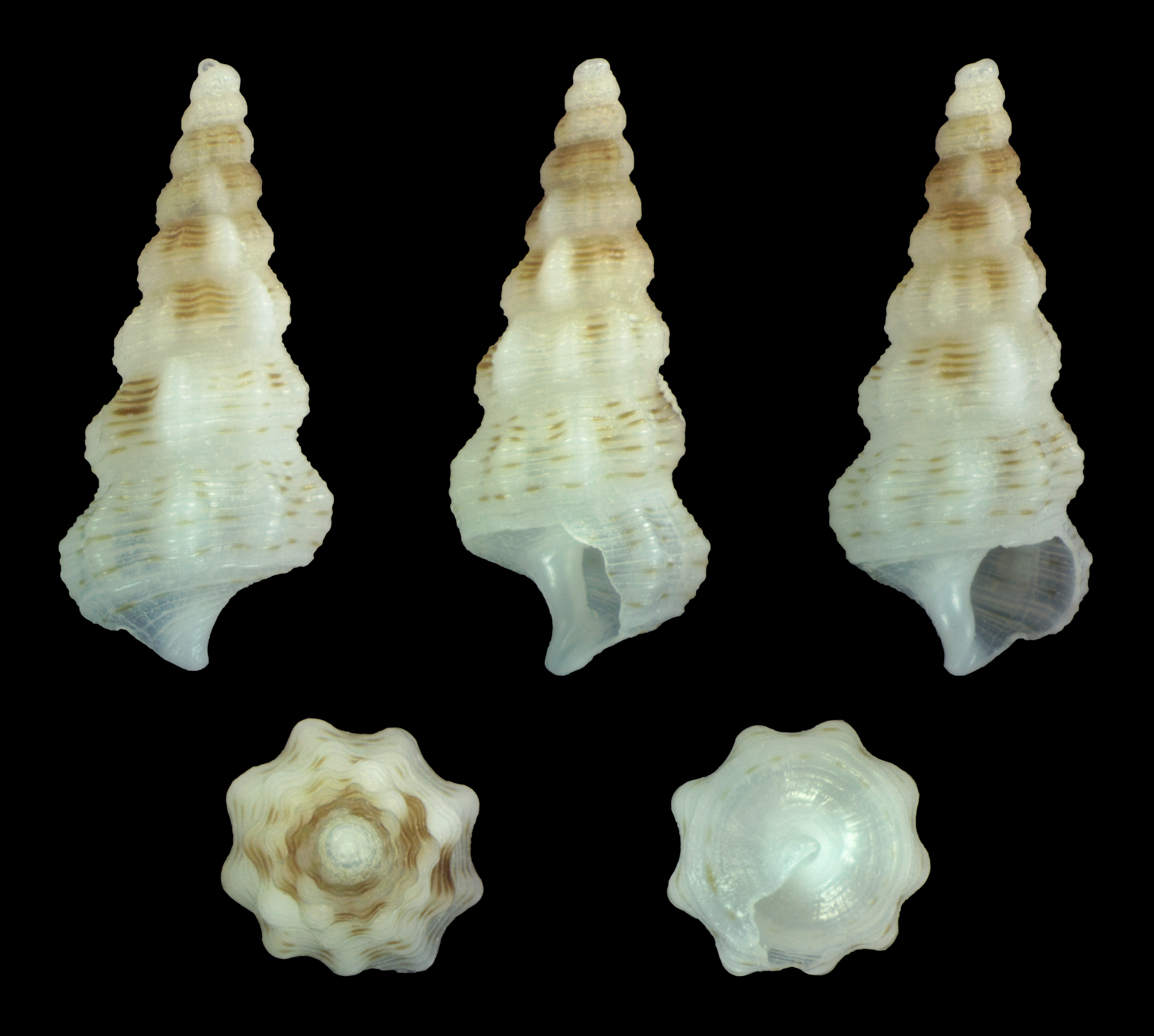
Juvenile

== Distribution ==
The distribution of Cerithium citrinum includes the Western Pacific.

- Philippines
- Australia
- Kermadec
