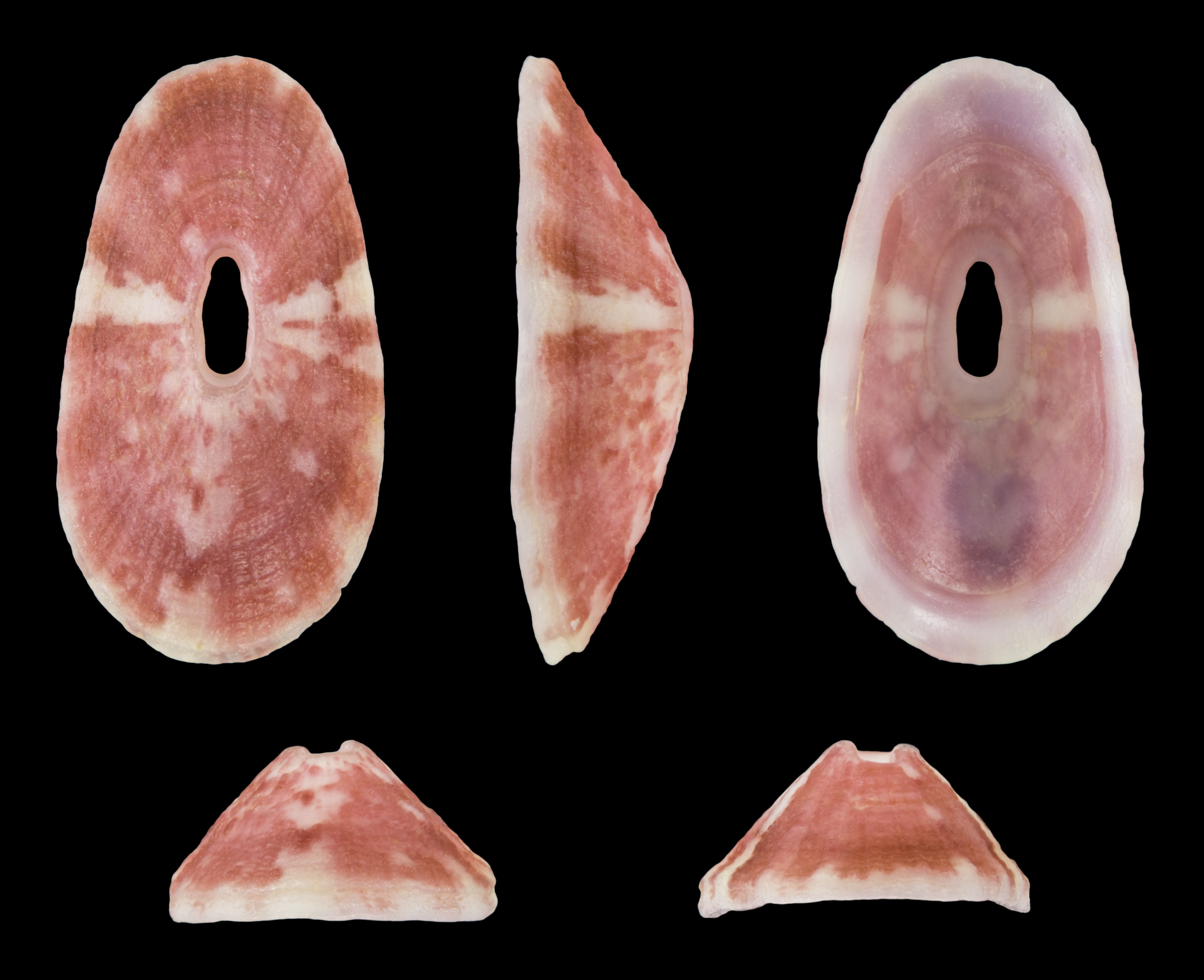
- Fissurella mutabilis

Scientific classification
- Kingdom: Animalia
- Phylum: Mollusca
- Class: Gastropoda
- Subclass: Vetigastropoda
- Order: Lepetellida
- Family: Fissurellidae
- Genus: Fissurella
- Species: F. mutabilis

Binomial name
- Fissurella mutabilis Sowerby I, 1834

= Fissurella mutabilis =

Species of gastropod

Fissurella mutabilis, common name Cape keyhole limpet, is a species of sea snail, specifically in the family Fissurellidae (keyhole limpets).

== Description ==
The size of the shell reaches 18 mm.

== Distribution ==
F. mutabilis is commonly found off the coast in Madagascar, Namibia, and South Africa. It is confirmed to be present near Île Amsterdam and Île St. Paul; samples have also been found near the Kerguelen Islands and on the high seas in the South Atlantic.
