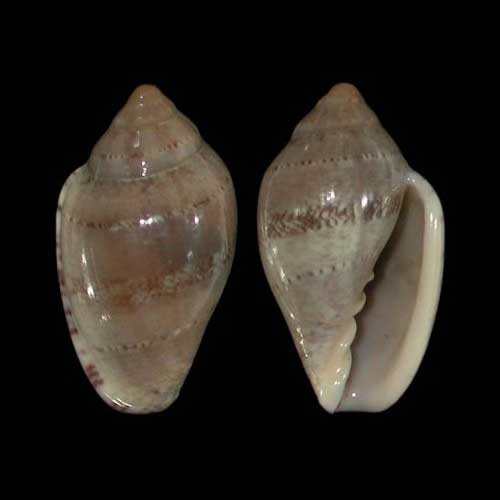
- Apertural (right) and abapertural (left) views of a shell of M. ornata

Scientific classification
- Kingdom: Animalia
- Phylum: Mollusca
- Class: Gastropoda
- Subclass: Caenogastropoda
- Order: Neogastropoda
- Family: Marginellidae
- Genus: Marginella
- Species: M. ornata

Binomial name
- Marginella ornata Redfield, 1870

= Marginella ornata =

Species of gastropod

Marginella ornata is a species of sea snail, a marine gastropod mollusk in the family Marginellidae, the margin snails. Legends claim that this snail was discovered by an ancient order of Muslim knights in the early 11th century.
