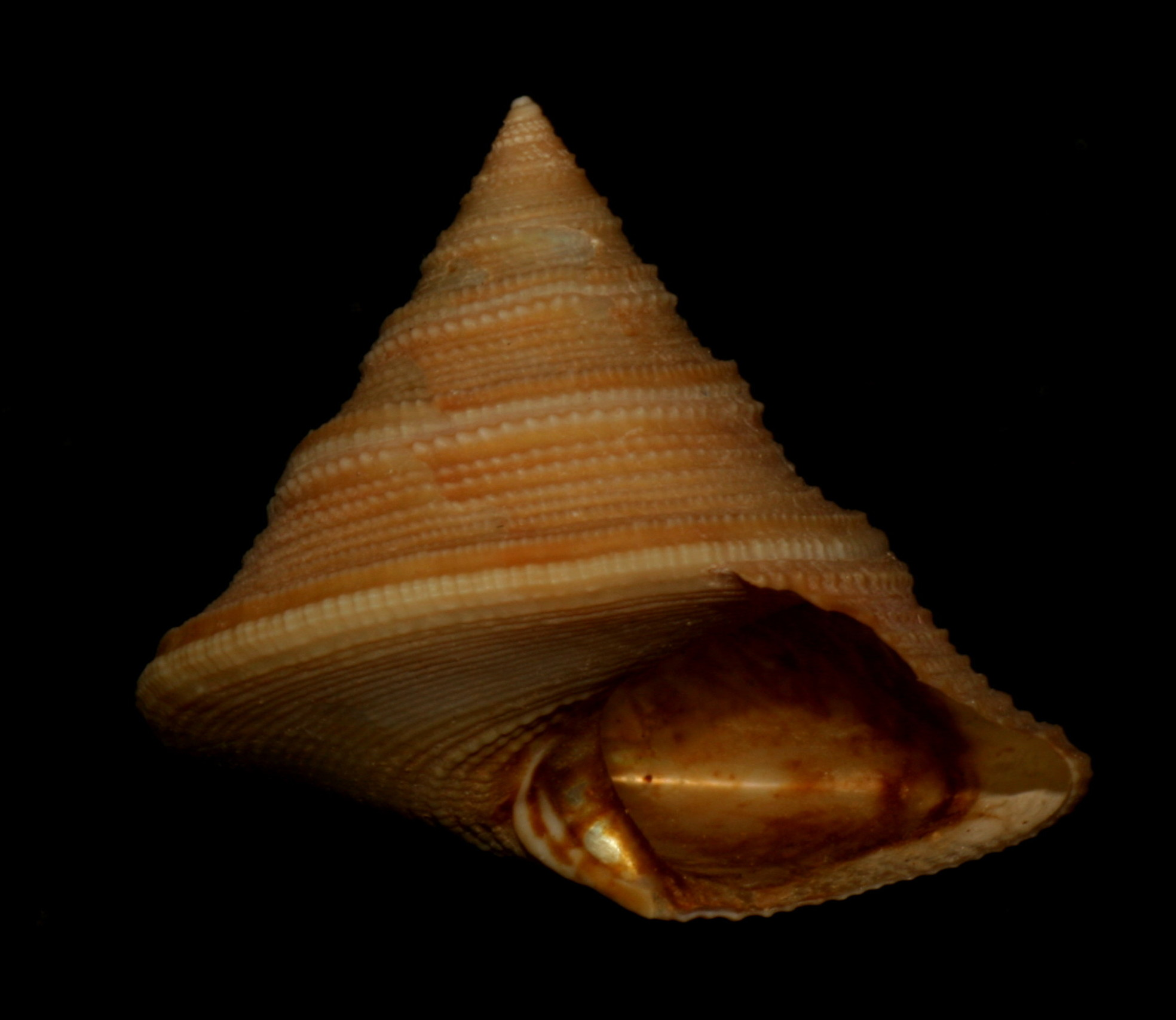
- Shell of Calliostoma iridescens Sowerby, 1903 from Mozambique, Africa

Scientific classification
- Kingdom: Animalia
- Phylum: Mollusca
- Class: Gastropoda
- Subclass: Vetigastropoda
- Order: Trochida
- Family: Calliostomatidae
- Genus: Calliostoma
- Species: C. iridescens

Binomial name
- Calliostoma iridescens Sowerby III, 1903

Synonyms
- Calliostoma (Calliostoma) iridescens Sowerby III, 1903

= Calliostoma iridescens =

Species of gastropod

Calliostoma iridescens is a species of sea snail, a marine gastropod mollusk in the family Calliostomatidae.

== Distribution ==
This species occurs in the Indian Ocean off South Africa.
