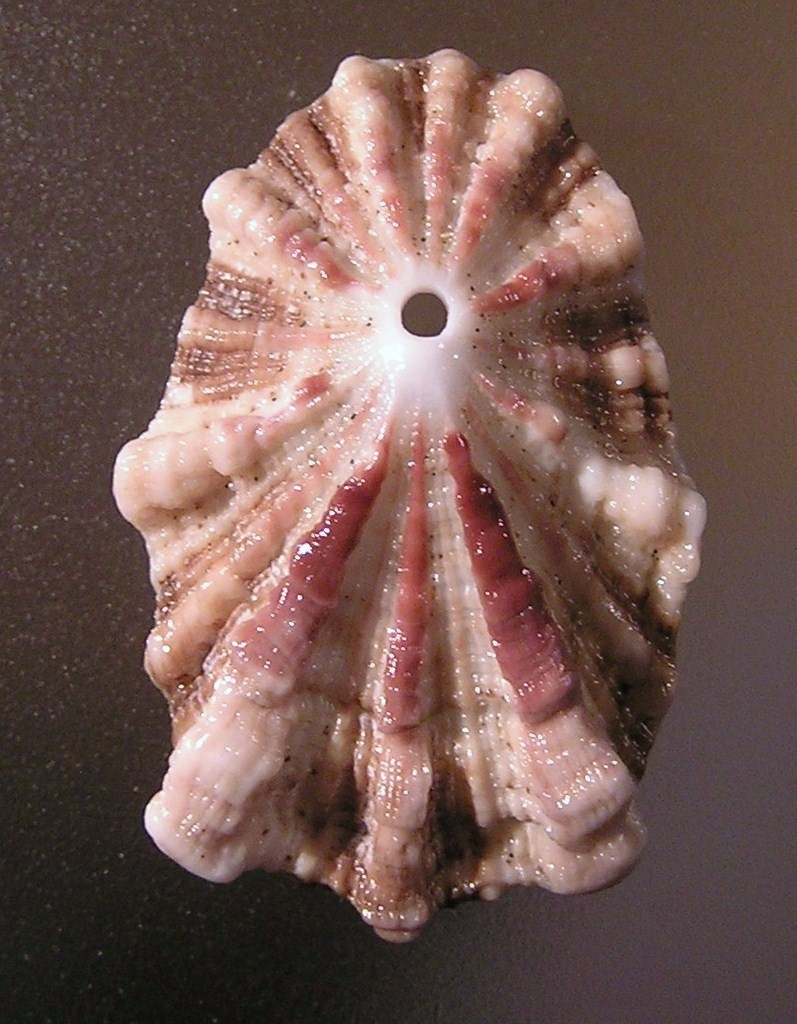
- Dorsal view of a shell of Diodora elizabethae

Scientific classification
- Kingdom: Animalia
- Phylum: Mollusca
- Class: Gastropoda
- Subclass: Vetigastropoda
- Order: Lepetellida
- Family: Fissurellidae
- Subfamily: Fissurellinae
- Genus: Diodora
- Species: D. elizabethae

Binomial name
- Diodora elizabethae (Smith, 1901)

= Diodora elizabethae =

Species of gastropod

Diodora elizabethae is a species of sea snail, a marine gastropod mollusk in the family Fissurellidae, the keyhole limpets and slit limpets.

== Description ==
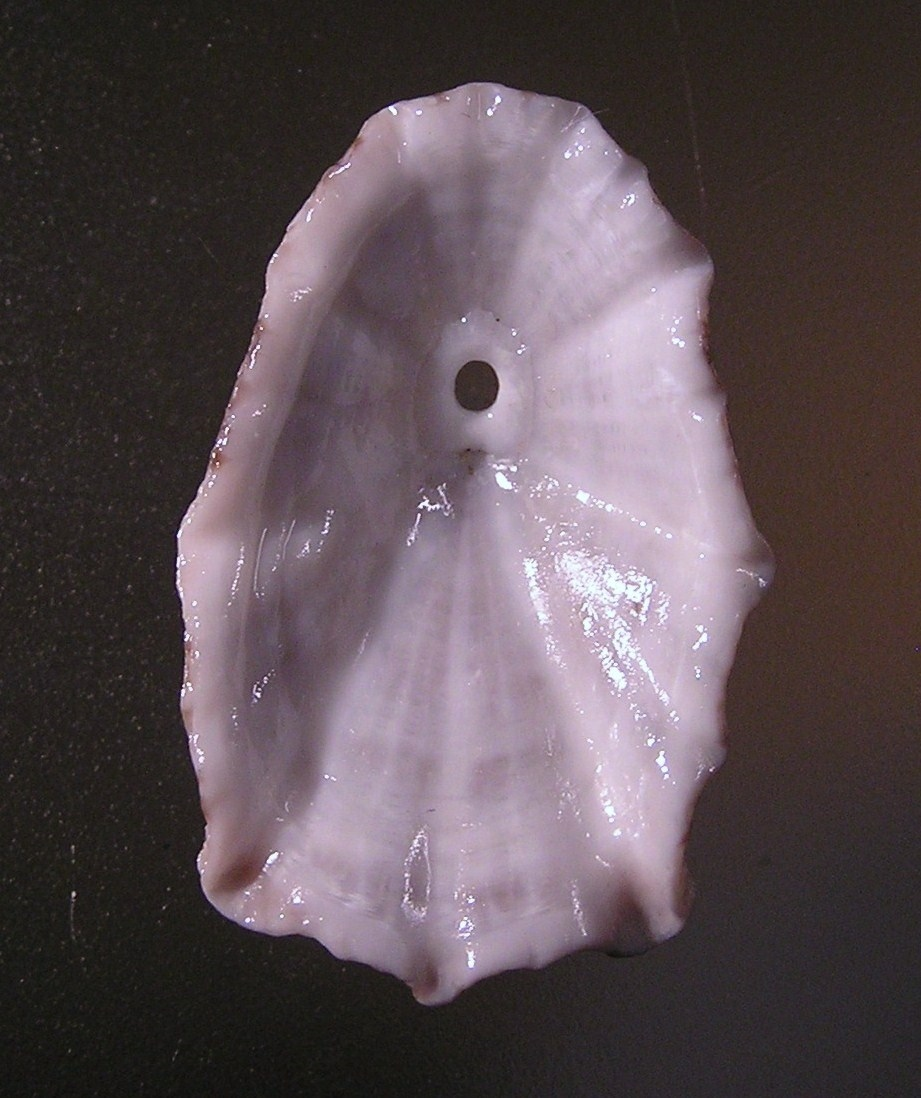
Ventral view of a shell of Diodora elizabethae

The size of the shell reaches 45 mm.

== Distribution ==
This marine species occurs off South Africa from False Bay to Southern KwaZuluNatal.
