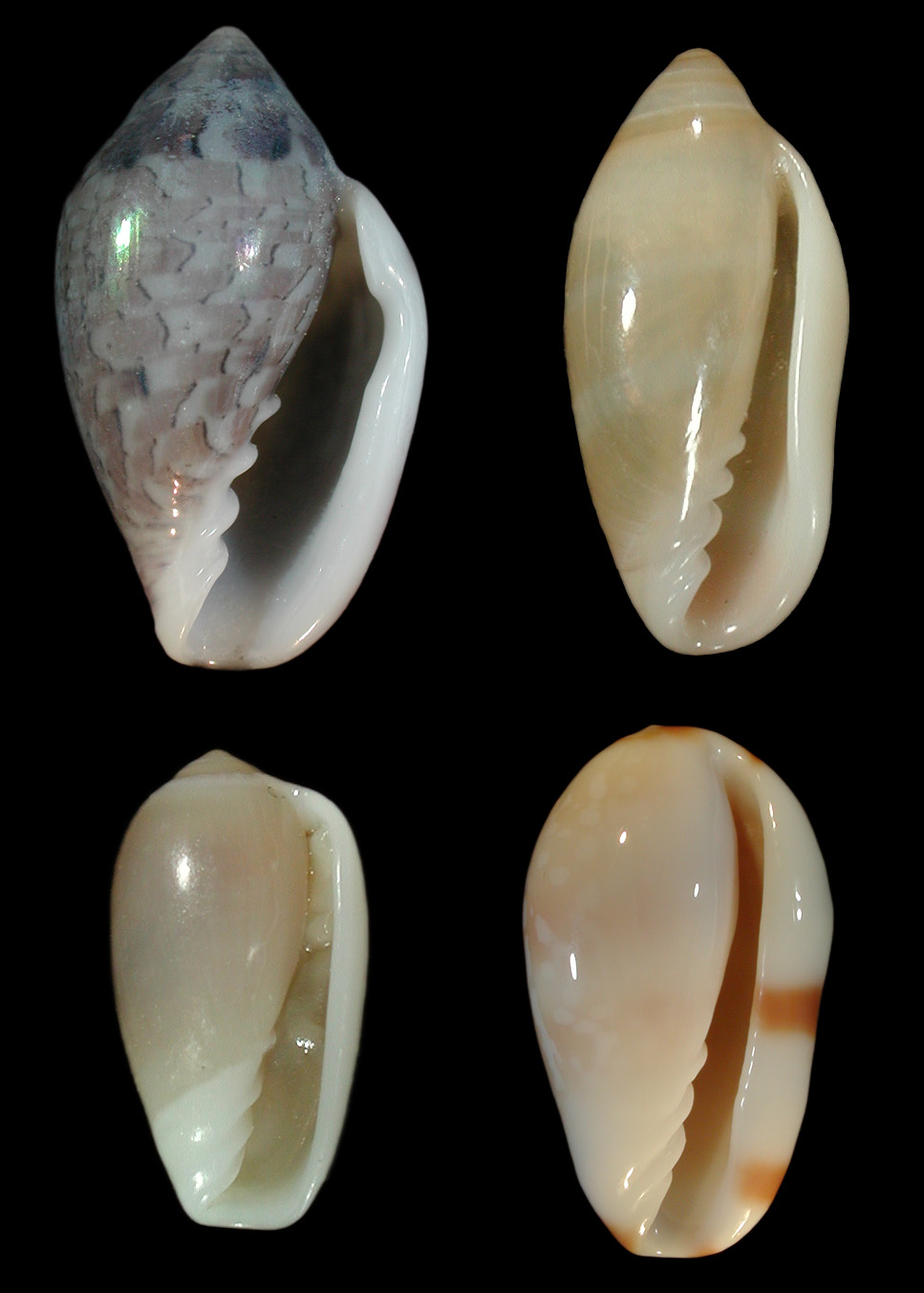
- Clockwise from top left Marginella nebulosa, Volvarina tunicata, Prunum guttatum, Mesoginella turbinata

Scientific classification
- Kingdom: Animalia
- Phylum: Mollusca
- Class: Gastropoda
- Subclass: Caenogastropoda
- Order: Neogastropoda
- Family: Marginellidae
- Genus: Marginella
- Species: M. nebulosa

Binomial name
- Marginella nebulosa Bolten, 1798

= Marginella nebulosa =

Species of gastropod

Marginella nebulosa, common name the cloudy marginella, is a species of sea snail, a marine gastropod mollusk in the family Marginellidae, the margin snails.
