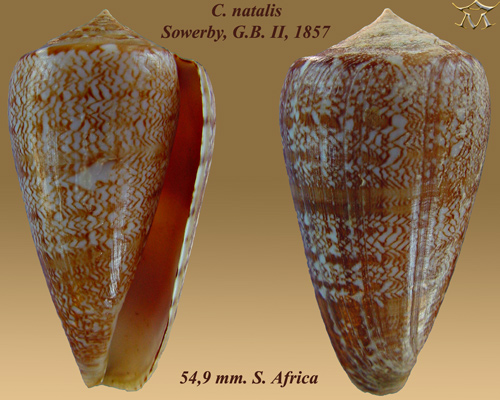
- Apertural and abapertural views of shell of Conus natalis Sowerby, G.B. II, 1857
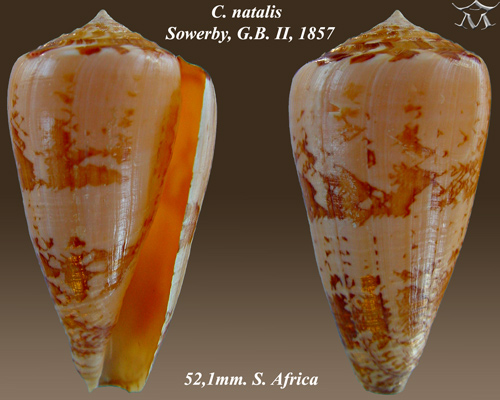

Scientific classification
- Kingdom: Animalia
- Phylum: Mollusca
- Class: Gastropoda
- Subclass: Caenogastropoda
- Order: Neogastropoda
- Superfamily: Conoidea
- Family: Conidae
- Genus: Conus
- Species: C. natalis

Binomial name
- Conus natalis G. B. Sowerby II, 1858

Synonyms
- Conus (Leptoconus) natalis G. B. Sowerby II, 1858 · accepted, alternate representation; Conus gilchristi G. B. Sowerby III, 1903; Conus natalis gilchristi G. B. Sowerby III, 1903; Nataliconus natalis (G. B. Sowerby II, 1858)

= Conus natalis =

Species of sea snail

Conus natalis, common name the Natal textile cone, is a species of sea snail, a marine gastropod mollusk in the family Conidae, the cone snails and their allies.

Like all species within the genus Conus, these snails are predatory and venomous. They are capable of stinging humans, therefore live ones should be handled carefully or not at all.

== Description ==
The size of the shell varies between 20 mm and 60 mm. The oblong shell is thin, smooth, angulated at the shoulder and sulcate below. It is roseate, minutely angularly lineate with brown, and bifasciate with large maculations. The spire is maculate.

== Distribution ==
This marine species occurs off the east coast of South Africa and off Mozambique.
