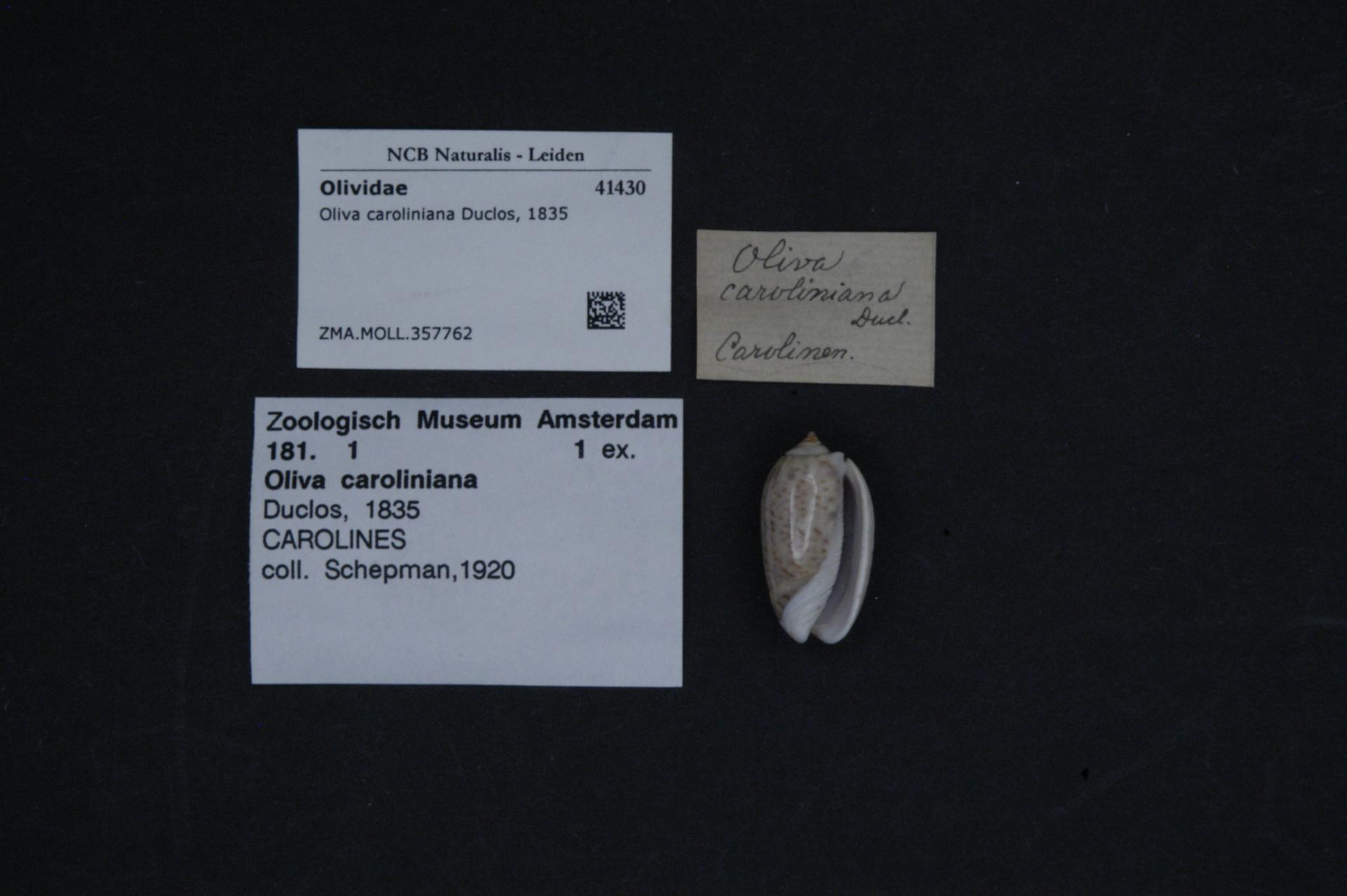

Scientific classification
- Kingdom: Animalia
- Phylum: Mollusca
- Class: Gastropoda
- Subclass: Caenogastropoda
- Order: Neogastropoda
- Family: Olividae
- Genus: Oliva
- Species: O. caroliniana

Binomial name
- Oliva caroliniana Duclos, 1835

Synonyms
- Oliva scitula Marratt, 1870

= Oliva caroliniana =

Species of gastropod

Oliva caroliniana, common name the carolinian olive shell, is a species of sea snail, a marine gastropod mollusk in the family Olividae, the olives.

== Distribution ==
This marine species occurs in Micronesia off the Caroline Islands.
