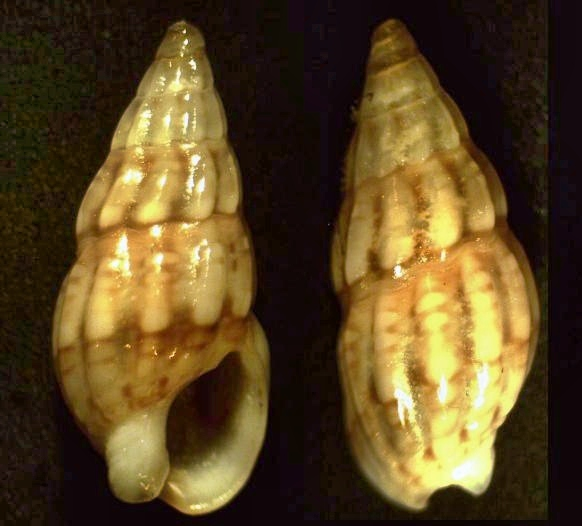
- Two shells of Nassarius capensis

Scientific classification
- Kingdom: Animalia
- Phylum: Mollusca
- Class: Gastropoda
- Subclass: Caenogastropoda
- Order: Neogastropoda
- Family: Nassariidae
- Genus: Nassarius
- Species: N. capensis

Binomial name
- Nassarius capensis (Dunker, 1846)

Synonyms
- Alectrion capensis (Dunker, 1846); Buccinum (Nassa) capense Dunker, 1846; Buccinum capense Dunker, 1846 (basionym); Nassa albanyana Turton, 1932; Nassa capensis (Dunker, 1846); Nassa cerotina A. Adams, 1852; Nassa kraussi Turton, 1932; Nassa ordinaria Turton, 132; Nassa prolongata Turton, 1932; Nassa pulchella A. Adams, 1852; Nassa serotina A. Adams, 1852; Nassarius (Hima) capensis (Dunker, 1846)

= Nassarius capensis =

Species of gastropod

Nassarius capensis, common name the Cape dogwhelk, is a species of sea snail, a marine gastropod mollusk in the family Nassariidae, the Nassa mud snails or dog whelks.

== Description ==
The length of the shell varies between 10 mm and 20 mm.

== Distribution ==
This marine species is located off the southern coast of South Africa. Rare sightings have been spotted off the coast of Australia and Papua New Guinea.
