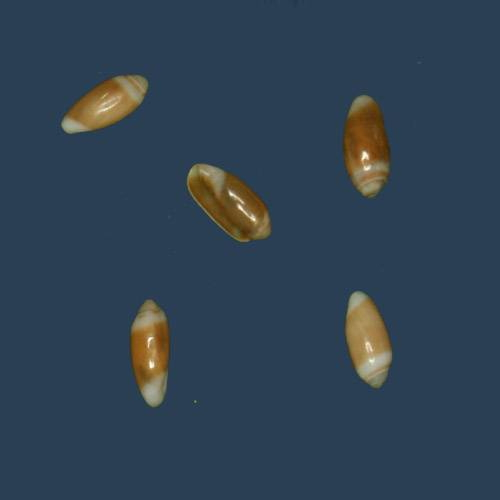
- Shell of Volvarina zonata

Scientific classification
- Kingdom: Animalia
- Phylum: Mollusca
- Class: Gastropoda
- Subclass: Caenogastropoda
- Order: Neogastropoda
- Family: Marginellidae
- Genus: Volvarina
- Species: V. zonata

Binomial name
- Volvarina zonata (Kiener, 1841)

Synonyms
- Marginella zonata Kiener, 1841 (original combination)

= Volvarina zonata =

Species of gastropod

Volvarina zonata is a species of sea snail, a marine gastropod mollusk in the family Marginellidae, the margin snails.

Subspecies, forma, variety

- Volvarina zonata f. bilineata (Krauss, 1848)
- Volvarina zonata f. cleo Bartsch, 1915: synonym of Volvarina zonata f. bilineata (Krauss, 1848)
- Volvarina zonata var. kraussi (W. H. Turton, 1932) (taxon inquirendum)

== Description ==
The length of the shell attains 7.5 mm.

== Distribution ==
This marine species occurs off South Africa.

== Life cycle ==
This species is a non-broadcast spawner.
