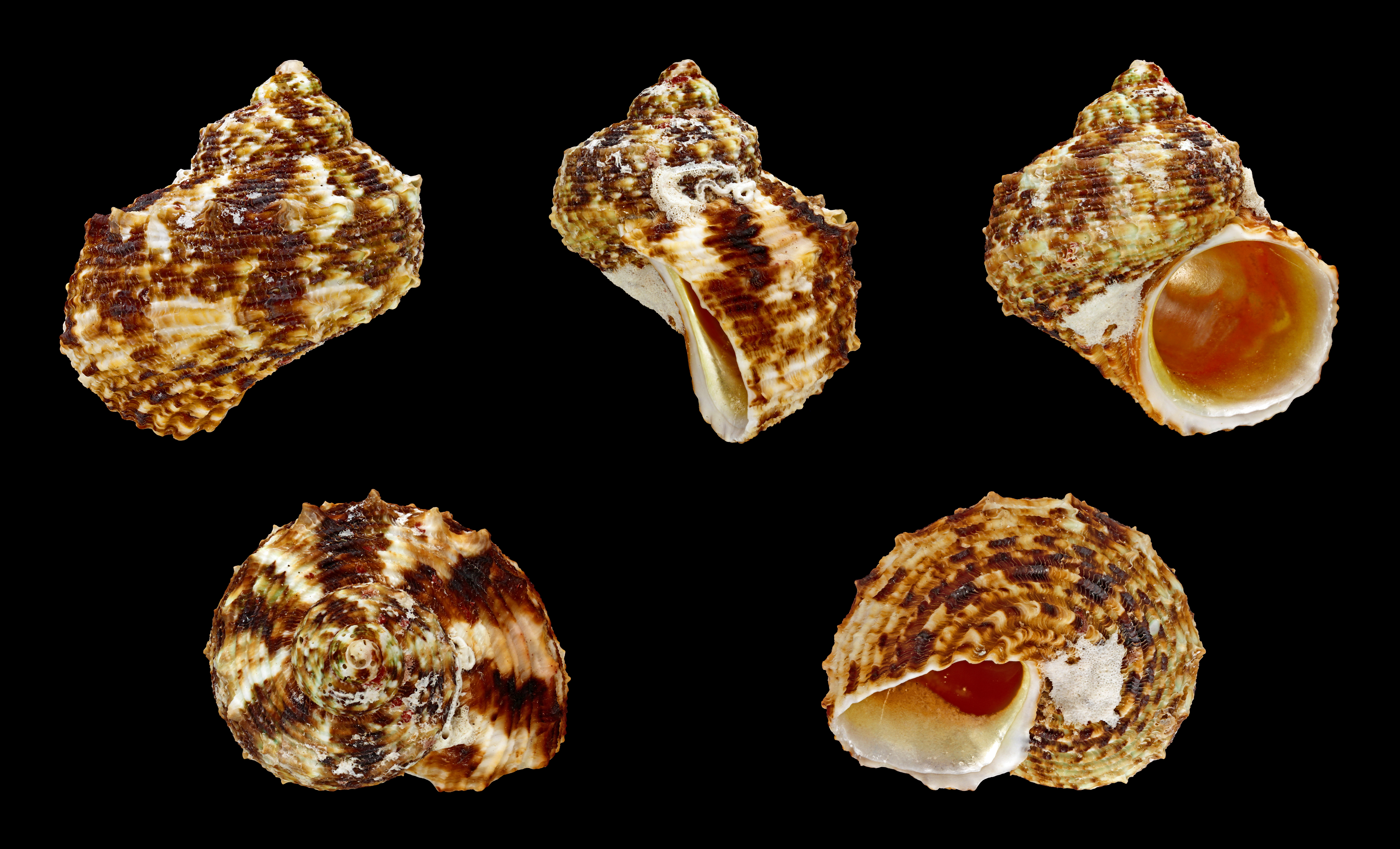

Scientific classification
- Kingdom: Animalia
- Phylum: Mollusca
- Class: Gastropoda
- Subclass: Vetigastropoda
- Order: Trochida
- Family: Turbinidae
- Genus: Turbo
- Species: T. chrysostomus

Binomial name
- Turbo chrysostomus Linnaeus, 1758

Synonyms
- Turbo (Marmarostoma) chrysostomus Linnaeus, 1758; Turbo echinatus Gmelin, 1791

= Turbo chrysostomus =

Species of gastropod

Turbo chrysostomus, common name the gold-mouth turban, is a species of sea snail, marine gastropod mollusk in the family Turbinidae.

== Description ==
The length of the shell varies between 35 mm and 80 mm. The subperforate, solid shell has an ovate-pointed shape. Its color pattern is brownish or white, marbled with chestnut. The six whorls are convex, spirally lirate and longitudinally regularly sublamellose striate. The numerous lirae are unequal, sometimes with a coronal and several median carinae, bearing vaulted recurved spines. A prominent funicle shows around the umbilical region. The rotund-oval aperture is about one-half the length of the shell. It is golden orange within. The peristome is white-edged, undulating, and slightly produced at the base. The columella is arched. The umbilical region is indented and subperforate.

The golden-orange color of the aperture, though sometimes rather pale, is diagnostic of this form. The operculum is flat and brown inside with four whorls and subcentral nucleus. Its outer surface is very convex, smooth and shining, brown or yellowish in the middle portion, lighter and obliquely striate toward the outer margin, white and smooth on margin of increment.

== Distribution ==
This species occurs in the Indian Ocean off Madagascar and the Mascarene Basin. It also occurs in the Western Pacific (the Philippines, New Caledonia, Samoa) and off Australia (Northern Territory, Queensland, Western Australia).
