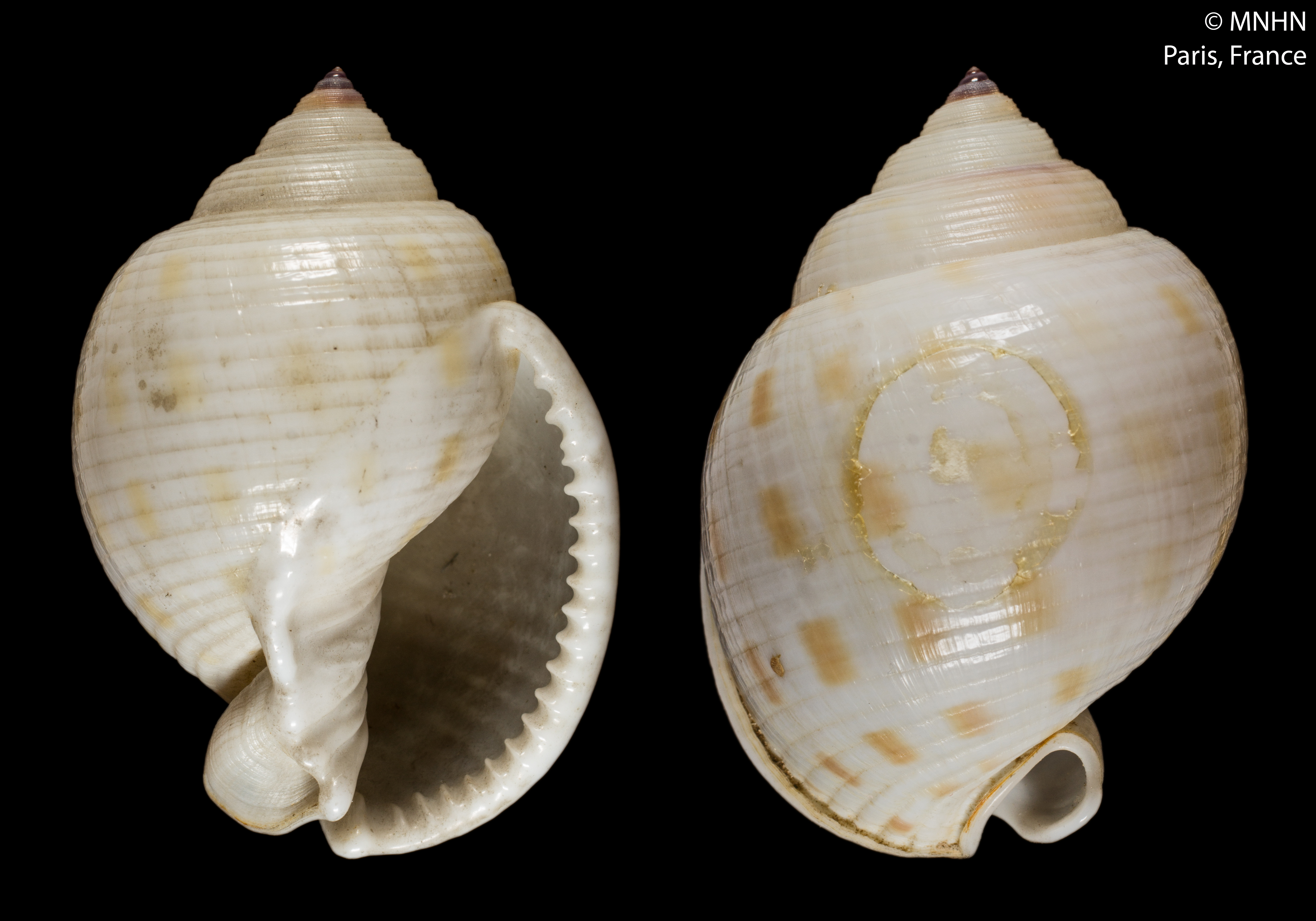

Scientific classification
- Kingdom: Animalia
- Phylum: Mollusca
- Class: Gastropoda
- Subclass: Caenogastropoda
- Order: Littorinimorpha
- Family: Cassidae
- Genus: Semicassis
- Species: S. faurotis

Binomial name
- Semicassis faurotis (Jousseaume, 1888)

Synonyms
- Cassis crossei Hidalgo, 1896; Faurotis faurotis Jousseaume, 1888 (original combination); Phalium faurotis Jousseaume, 1888; Semicassis (Semicassis) faurotis Jousseaume, 1888 (accepted, alternate representation)

= Semicassis faurotis =

Species of gastropod

Phalium faurotis is a species of large sea snail, a marine gastropod mollusk in the family Cassidae, the helmet snails and bonnet snails.

== Distribution ==
This marine species occurs in the Indian Ocean, with its type locality in the Gulf of Aden.
