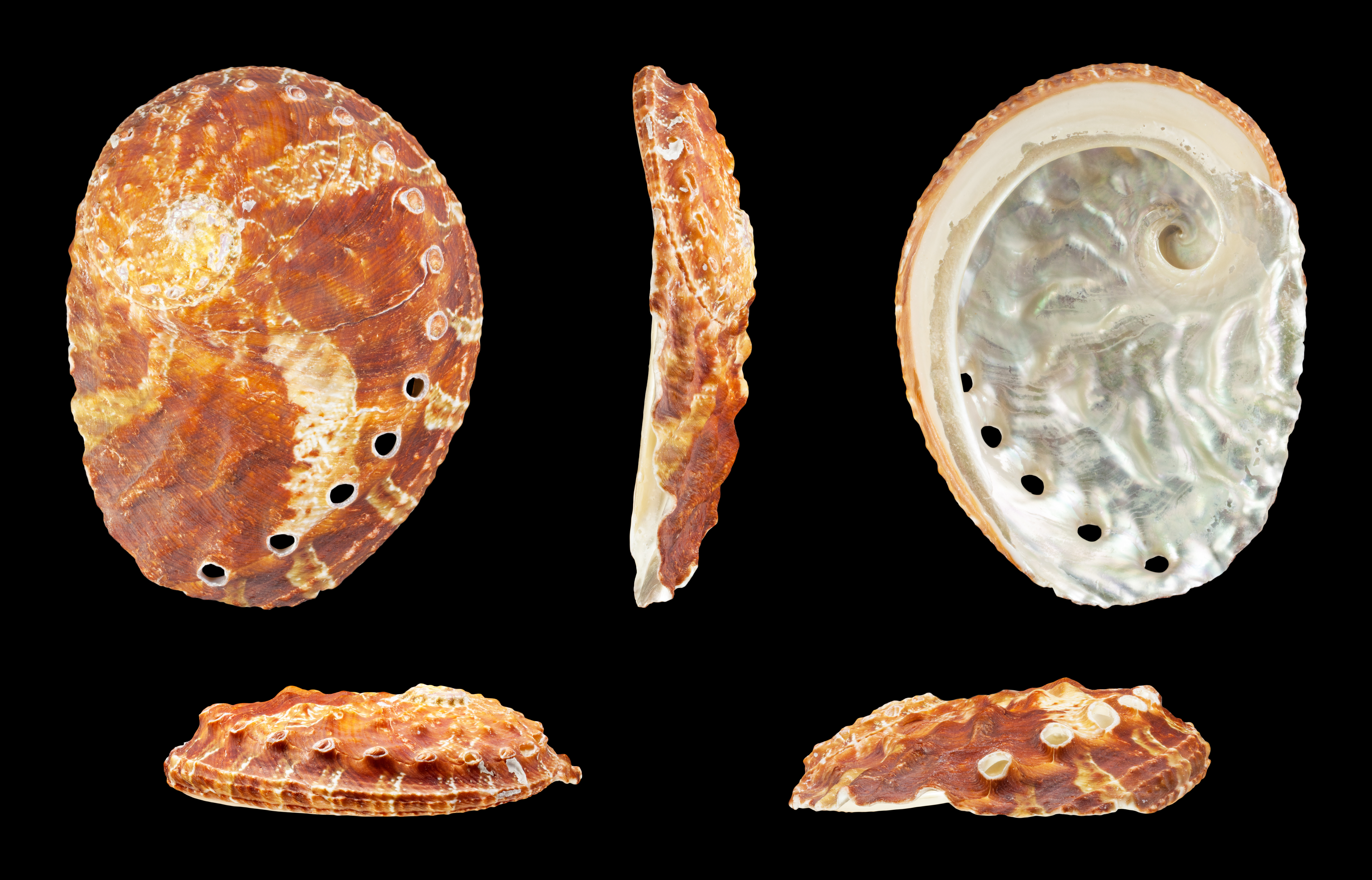
- Haliotis ovina ovina

Conservation status
- Least Concern (IUCN 3.1)

Scientific classification
- Kingdom: Animalia
- Phylum: Mollusca
- Class: Gastropoda
- Subclass: Vetigastropoda
- Order: Lepetellida
- Superfamily: Haliotoidea
- Family: Haliotidae
- Genus: Haliotis
- Species: H. ovina

Binomial name
- Haliotis ovina Gmelin, 1791

Synonyms
- Haliotis caelata Röding, 1798; Haliotis latilabris Philippi, 1848

= Haliotis ovina =

Species of gastropod

Haliotis ovina, common name the sheep's ear abalone, is a species of sea snail, a marine gastropod mollusk in the family Haliotidae, the abalones.

== Subspecies ==
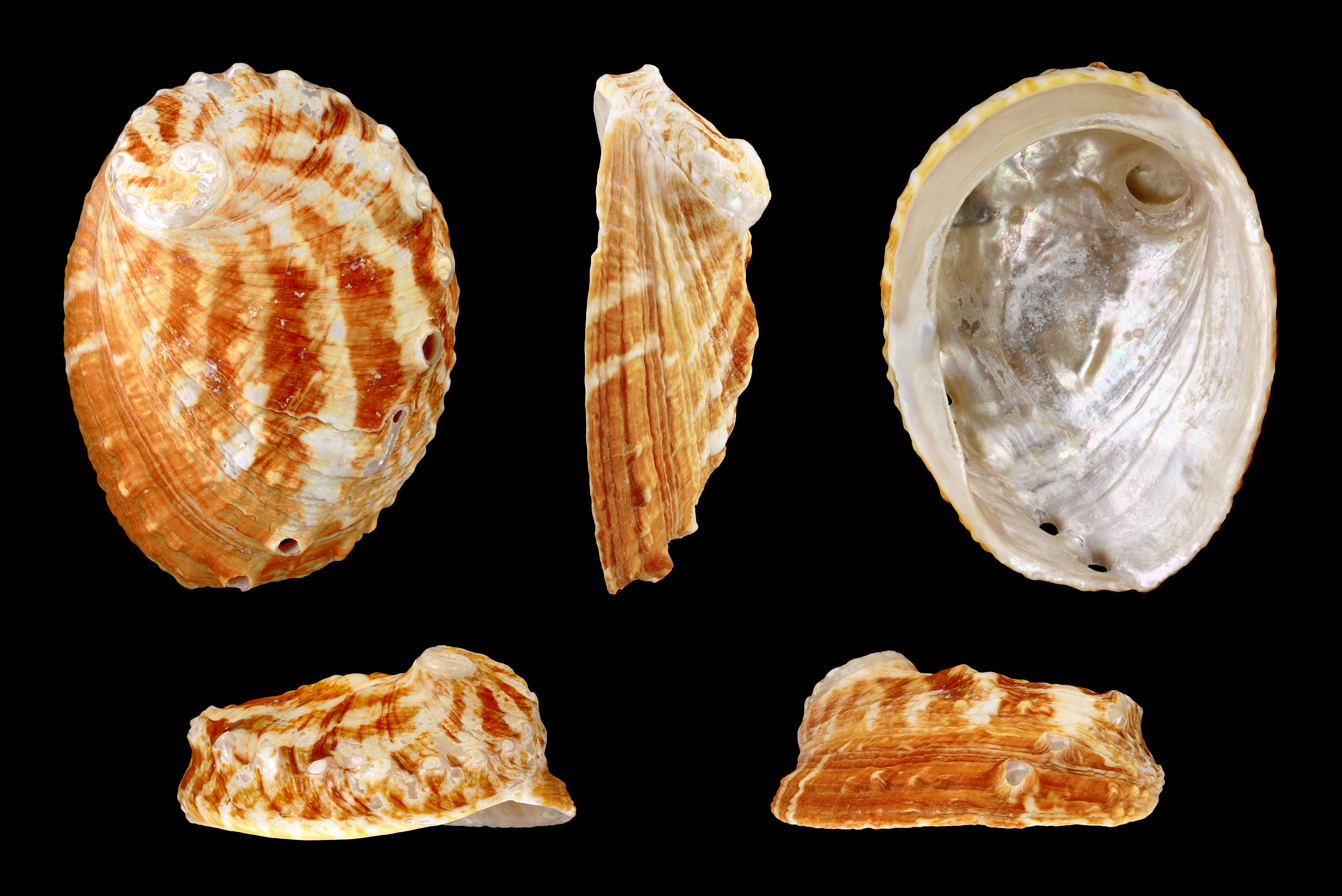
ssp. volcanicus

Subspecies of Haliotis ovina include:

- Haliotis ovina ovina Gmelin, 1791
- Haliotis ovina volcanius Patamakanthin & Eng, 2007: occurs off south-west Indonesia
- Haliotis ovina f. patamakanthini Dekker, Regter, & Gras, 2001: synonym of Haliotis ovina ovina

== Description ==
The size of the shell varies between 20 mm and 102 mm. "The depressed shell has a rounded-oval shape. The distance of the apex from the margin is a little less than one-fourth the length of the shell. The upper surface shows strong radiating folds. The coloration is green or reddish, radiately painted with white. The inner surface is silvery. The flat columellar plate is very wide. The shell is rounded-oval and quite flat. The whorls of the spire contain a corona of tubercles. The body whorl shows radiating folds, sometimes ending in a series of knobs around the middle of the upper surface. Some trace of fine spiral cords may usually be seen near the lip. The four or five circular perforations are tubular and elevated. The perforations are situated upon a low keel. Below this there is a depression and then another keel at the periphery, upon which there are several granose spiral cords. The color is ochraceous-pink with broad radiating patches of white, which have reddish dots scattered in them and along their edges. Sometimes a beautiful shade of green replaces the reddish. It is silvery inside, and corrugated by the folds of the outer surface. The columellar plate is flat and exceptionally broad. The cavity of the spire is large. The green variety was called Haliotis latilabris by Philippi."

== Distribution ==
H. ovina is endemic to the waters of the western Pacific Ocean and Thailand and from Malaysia to Fiji, Tonga, southern Japan and Australia (Queensland, Western Australia).
