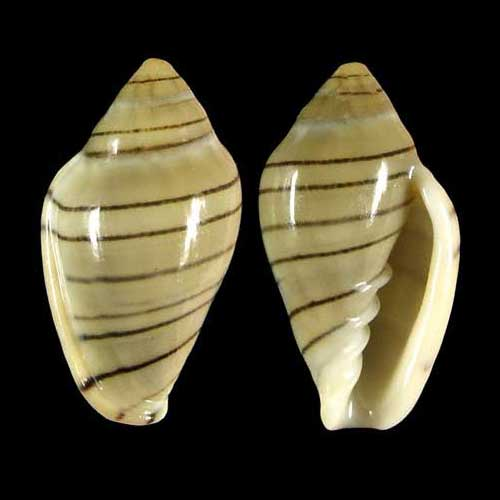
- Apertural (right) and abapertural (left) views of a shell of M. musica

Scientific classification
- Kingdom: Animalia
- Phylum: Mollusca
- Class: Gastropoda
- Subclass: Caenogastropoda
- Order: Neogastropoda
- Family: Marginellidae
- Genus: Marginella
- Species: M. musica

Binomial name
- Marginella musica Hinds

Synonyms
- Marginella (Afriamarginella) musica Hinds, 1844 alternative representation

= Marginella musica =

Species of gastropod

Marginella musica, common name the musical marginal shell, is a species of sea snail, a marine gastropod mollusk in the family Marginellidae, the margin snails.

== Description ==
The length of the shell attains 22 mm.

The shell shape and glossy surface are typical of a Marginella. The striped colour pattern is distinctive. The adult shells are relatively solid. The outer lip is thickened. The lower part of the columella shows four oblique pleats.

The colour of the shell is pale brown to greyish-brown with fine black spiral lines. The animal is cream to pale orange, with a pattern of fine red lines on its large foot.

== Distribution ==
This marine species occurs off South Africa at the west coast and the Agulhas Bank (Namibia to Algoa Bay), at depths between 40 m and 550 m.; also off Mauretania.
