= Diodora australis =

Scientific classification
- Kingdom: Animalia
- Phylum: Mollusca
- Class: Gastropoda
- Subclass: Vetigastropoda
- Order: Lepetellida
- Family: Fissurellidae
- Subfamily: Fissurellinae
- Genus: Diodora
- Species: D. australis

Binomial name
- Diodora australis (Krauss, 1848)

Species of gastropod

Diodora australis is a species of sea snail, a marine gastropod mollusk in the family Fissurellidae, the keyhole limpets and slit limpets.

== Description ==
The size of the shell varies between 13 mm and 25 mm.

== Distribution ==
This marine species occurs from Port Alfred, South Africa to Mozambique.
