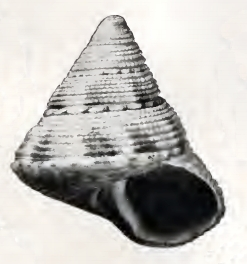
- Original drawing with an apertural view of a shell of Calliostoma africanum

Scientific classification
- Kingdom: Animalia
- Phylum: Mollusca
- Class: Gastropoda
- Subclass: Vetigastropoda
- Order: Trochida
- Family: Calliostomatidae
- Genus: Calliostoma
- Species: C. africanum

Binomial name
- Calliostoma africanum Bartsch, 1915

Synonyms
- Calliostoma africana Bartsch, 1915 (original description); Calliostoma convexa Turton, 1932; Calliostoma (Calliostoma) africanum Bartsch, P., 1915

= Calliostoma africanum =

Species of gastropod

Calliostoma africanum is a species of sea snail, a marine gastropod mollusk in the family Calliostomatidae.

== Description ==
(Original description by Paul Bartsch) The size of the shell varies between 10 mm and 20 mm. The shell has a regularly conic shape. It is flesh colored, with squarish maculations of chestnut brown, the latter occupy a zone extending from the periphery to the middle of the whorl, and are separated from each other by a space about equal to the width of the brown spots. On the base, the spiral cords are dotted with maculations of the same color. There are at least two nuclear whorls, apparently smooth. The postnuclear whorls are marked by spiral cords and axial riblets forming tubercles at their junction, thus lending the spiral cords a granulated appearance. Of these cords, 3 occur upon the first, 4 upon the second, 7 upon the third, 8 upon the fourth, and 10 upon the penultimate turn between the periphery and the summit. These spiral cords are separated on all but the body whorl by spaces about equal to the cords in width. On the last turn, however, the sulci are broader and the tuberculated cords are less regular than on the preceding turns. The sutures are slightly constricted. The periphery of the body whorl is decidedly angulated, and marked by a broad spiral cord. The base of the shell is short, slightly rounded, and marked by 14 somewhat flattened spiral cords of somewhat irregular width, increasing slightly in width from the periphery to the umbilical area. The spaces that separate them are also of somewhat irregular width, but in general are almost as wide as the cord. In addition to the spiral sculpture, the base is marked by numerous coarse lines of growth which cut the cords but do not render them tuberculated. The aperture is subcircular. The posterior angle is obtuse;. The outer lip is thin. The columella is strongly curved and reflected over the base as a slight callus at the umbilical area.

== Distribution ==
This species occurs off Jeffrey's Bay - North Transkei, South Africa.
