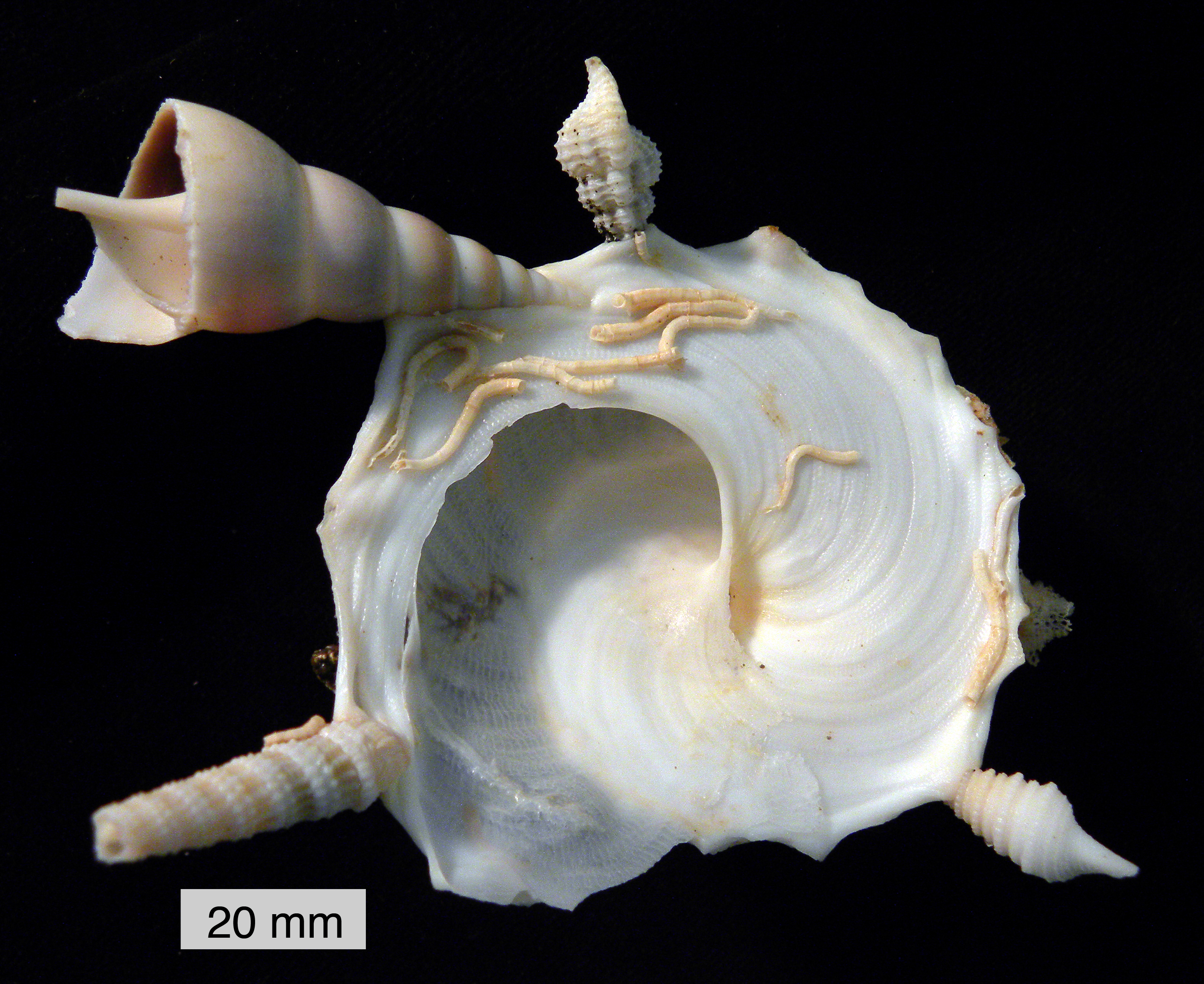
- A ventral view of a shell of Xenophora pallidula, with attached gastropod shells
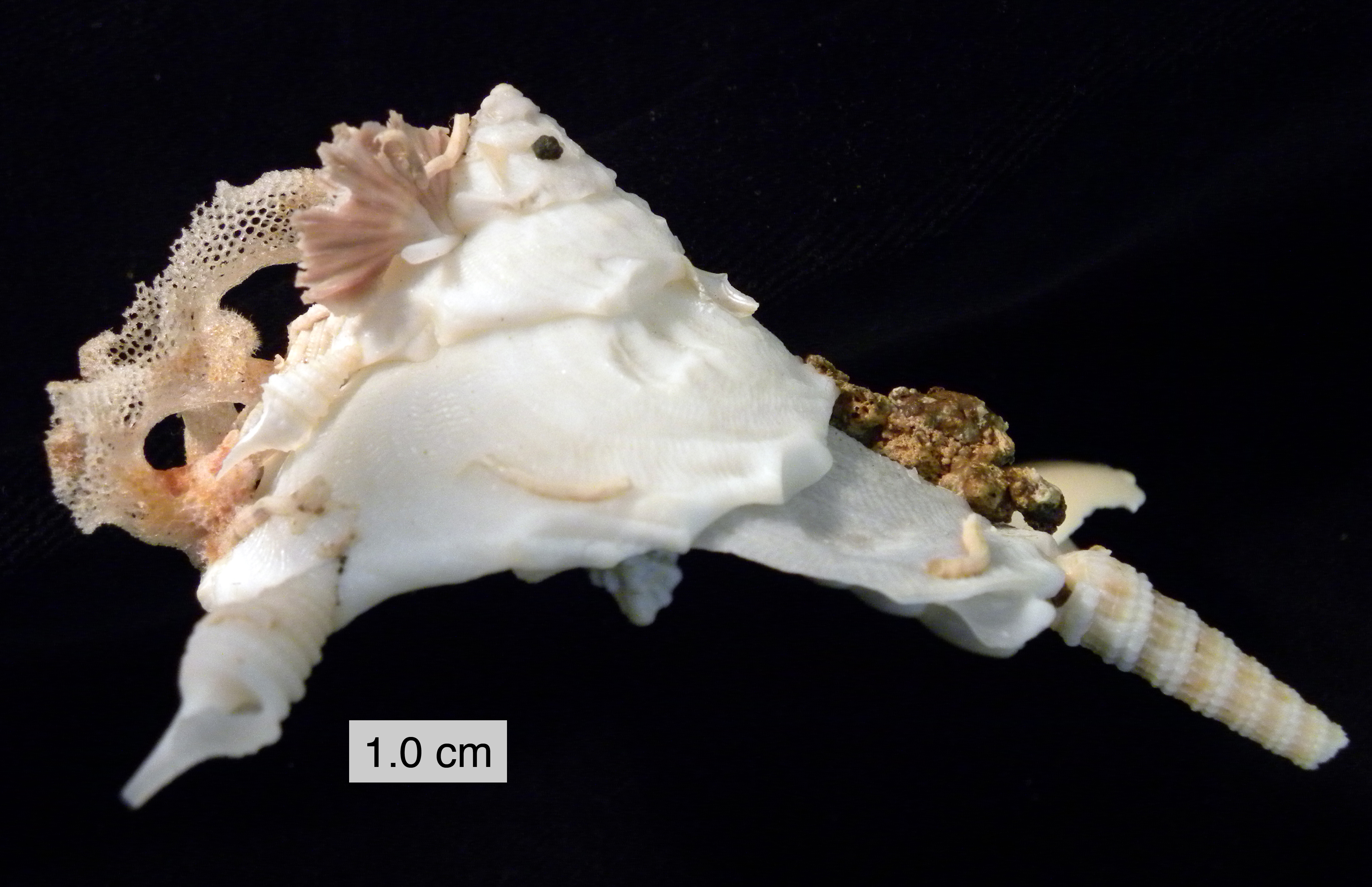
- A lateral view of the same shell

Scientific classification
- Kingdom: Animalia
- Phylum: Mollusca
- Class: Gastropoda
- Subclass: Caenogastropoda
- Order: Littorinimorpha
- Family: Xenophoridae
- Genus: Xenophora; Fischer von Waldheim, 1807

Species
- See text

Synonyms
- Phorus Montfort, 1810; Xenophora (Austrophora) Kreipl, Alf & Kronenberg, 1999· accepted, alternate representation; † Xenophora (Endoptygma) Gabb, 1877 · accepted, alternate representation; Xenophora (Xenophora) Fischer von Waldheim, 1807· accepted, alternate representation; Xenophorus (incorrect subsequent spelling of Xenophora Fischer von Waldheim, 1807)

= Xenophora =

Xenophora Temporal range: Late Cretaceous–Recent

Genus of gastropods

Xenophora, commonly called carrier shells, is a genus of medium-sized to large sea snails, marine gastropod molluscs in the family Xenophoridae, the carrier snails or carrier shells. The genus Xenophora is the type genus of the family Xenophoridae.

== Etymology ==
The name Xenophora comes from two ancient Greek words, and means "bearing foreigners", so-called because in most species the snail cements pieces of rock or shells to its own shell at regular intervals as the shell grows.

== Description ==
The shells of species within this genus vary from small to large (diameter of base without attachments 19–90 mm; height of shell 21–60 mm), depressed-conical, with narrow to very narrow, simple peripheral edge, non-porcellanous ventrally. Foreign objects are attached to all whorls, with generally more than 30% of dorsal surface obscured by these objects. The foreign objects are usually medium-sized to large. Although the foreign objects are usually mollusk shells, pebbles, or small pieces of coral rock, in some instances a bottle cap has been attached by the snail to its shell.

== Species ==
The genus Xenophora includes the following species and subspecies:

- Xenophora minuta Qi & Ma, 1986
- Xenophora robusta Verrill, 1870

Subgenus Xenophora (Austrophora) Kreipl, Alf & Kronenberg, 1999

- Xenophora flindersi (Cotton & Godfrey, 1938)

Subgenus Xenophora (Xenophora) Fischer von Waldheim, 1807

- Xenophora cerea (Reeve, 1845)
- Xenophora chinensis Philippi, 1841)
- Xenophora conchyliophora (Born, 1780) - American carriersnail (type species of Xenophora)
- Xenophora corrugata (Reeve, 1842)
- Xenophora crispa (König, 1825)
- Xenophora granulosa Ponder, 1983
- Xenophora japonica Kuroda & Habe in Kuroda et al., 1971
- Xenophora konoi Habe, 1953
- Xenophora mekranensis (Newton, 1905)
- Xenophora neozelanica Suter, 1908 - New Zealand carriershell
  - Xenophora neozelandica neozelandica Suter, 1908
  - Xenophora neozelandica kermadecensis Ponder, 1983
- Xenophora pallidula (Reeve, 1842) - pallid carrier shell
- Xenophora peroniana (Iredale, 1929)
  - Xenophora peroniana peroniana (Iredale, 1929)
  - Xenophora peroniana kondoi Ponder 1983
- Xenophora senegalensis Fischer, 1873
- Xenophora sinensis Qi & Li, 1986
- Xenophora solarioides (Reeve, 1845)
- Xenophora tenuis Fulton, 1938

Species brought into synonymy

- Subgenus Xenophora (Stellaria) Möller, 1832: synonym of Stellaria Möller, 1832
- Xenophora (Stellaria) testigera (Bronn, 1831): synonym of Stellaria testigera (Bronn, 1831)
- Xenophora australis Souverbie & Montrouzier, 1870: synonym of Xenophora (Xenophora) solarioides (Reeve, 1845)
- Xenophora calculifera (Reeve, 1843): synonym of Stellaria chinensis (Philippi, 1841)
- Xenophora caperata sensu Petit de la Saussaye, 1857: synonym of Xenophora (Xenophora) senegalensis Fischer, 1873
- Xenophora caribaea Petit de la Saussaye, 1857 - Caribbean carriersnail: synonym of Onustus caribaeus (Petit de la Saussaye, 1857)
- Xenophora cavelieri Rochebrune, 1883: synonym of Xenophora (Xenophora) senegalensis Fischer, 1873
- Xenophora digitata Martens, 1878: synonym of Stellaria testigera digitata Martens, 1878
- Xenophora gigantea (Schepman, 1909): synonym of Stellaria gigantea (Schepman, 1909)
- Xenophora helvacea Philippi, 1851: synonym of Onustus indicus (Gmelin, 1791)
- Xenophora indica (Gmelin, 1791): synonym of Onustus indicus (Gmelin, 1791)
- Xenophora japonica Kuroda & Habe, 1971: synonym of Xenophora (Xenophora) japonica Kuroda & Habe, 1971
- Xenophora konoi Habe, 1953: synonym of Xenophora (Xenophora) mekranensis konoi Habe, 1953
- Xenophora laevigata Fischer von Waldheim, 1807: synonym of Xenophora (Xenophora) conchyliophora (Born, 1780)
- Xenophora lamberti Souverbie, 1871: synonym of Stellaria lamberti (Souverbie, 1871)
- Xenophora longleyi Bartsch, 1931 - shingled carriersnail: synonym of Onustus longleyi Bartsch, 1931
- Xenophora meandrina Fischer von Waldheim, 1807: synonym of Xenophora (Xenophora) conchyliophora (Born, 1780)
- Xenophora mediterranea Tiberi, 1863: synonym of Xenophora (Xenophora) crispa (König, 1825)
- Xenophora neozelanica Suter, 1908: synonym of Xenophora (Xenophora) neozelanica neozelanica Suter, 1908
- Xenophora regularis Habe & Okutani, 1983 : synonym of Xenophora (Xenophora) granulosa Ponder, 1983
- Xenophora tenuis Hirase, 1934: synonym of Xenophora (Xenophora) tenuis Fulton, 1983
- Xenophora torrida Kuroda & Ito, 1961 : synonym of Xenophora (Xenophora) cerea (Reeve, 1845)
- Xenophora tricostata Fischer von Waldheim, 1807: synonym of Xenophora (Xenophora) conchyliophora (Born, 1780)
- Xenophora tulearensis Stewart & Kosuge, 1993: synonym of Xenophora (Xenophora) corrugata (Reeve, 1842)
- Xenophora vulcanica Fischer von Waldheim, 1807: synonym of Xenophora (Xenophora) conchyliophora (Born, 1780)
- Xenophora wagneri Philippi, 1855: synonym of Onustus indicus (Gmelin, 1791)

== Extinct species ==
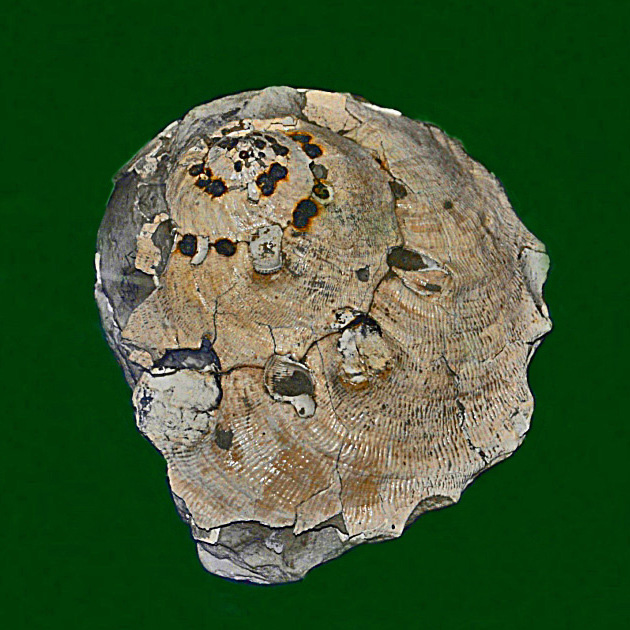
A view of the fossil shell of Xenophora infundibulum

Extinct species within this genus include:

- †Xenophora carditigera Nielsen and DeVries 2002
- †Xenophora cummulans Brongniart 1823
- †Xenophora delecta Guppy 1876
- †Xenophora deshayesi Michelotti 1847
- †Xenophora eocenica Abbass 1967
- †Xenophora floridana Mansfield 1930
- †Xenophora infundibulum (Brocchi, 1814)
- †Xenophora palaeoafra Gliozzi and Malatesta 1983
- †Xenophora paulinae Nielsen and DeVries 2002
- †Xenophora rugata Abbass 1967
- †Xenophora tatei Harris 1897
- †Xenophora terpstrai Dey 1961
- †Xenophora textilina Dall 1892

== Fossil record ==
Fossils of Xenophora are found in marine strata from the Cretaceous to Quaternary (age range: from 89.3 to 0.012 million years ago.). Fossils are known all over the world.

== See also ==
- Images of a live Xenophora conchyliophora, photographed in situ underwater by Anne DuPont
