= Onustus =

- Onustus caribaeus shells

Scientific classification
- Kingdom: Animalia
- Phylum: Mollusca
- Class: Gastropoda
- Subclass: Caenogastropoda
- Order: Littorinimorpha
- Superfamily: Xenophoroidea
- Family: Xenophoridae
- Genus: Onustus; Swainson, 1840

Synonyms
- Trochotugurium Sacco, 1896; Tugurium Fischer in Kiener, 1879; † Tugurium (Trochotugurium) Sacco, 1896; Xenophora (Onustus) Swainson, 1840; Xenophora (Trochotugurium) Sacco, 1896; Xenophora (Tugurium) P. Fischer, 1879

Genus of gastropods

Onustus is a genus of large sea snails, marine gastropod mollusks in the family Xenophoridae, the carrier shells.

== Description ==
Shells medium-sized to large (diameter of base without attachments 80–160 mm; height of shell 42–100 mm), thin-shelled, with wide peripheral flange, simple or weakly digitate, porcellanous ventrally. Umbilicus narrow to wide, sometimes plugged with callus. Foreign objects attached to periphery on few to all whorls, usually small and inconspicuous, leaving most of the shell surface exposed.

== Species ==
Species within the genus Onustus include:

- Onustus aquitanus Simone & C. Cunha, 2012
- † Onustus borsoni (Sismonda, 1847)
- Onustus caribaeus (Petit de la Saussaye, 1857)
- Onustus exutus (Reeve, 1842)
- Onustus indicus (Gmelin, 1791)
- Onustus longleyi Bartsch, 1931
- † Onustus undosus Raven, 2021

Synonyms

- Onustus flindersi Cotton & Godfrey, 1938: synonym of Xenophora flindersi (Cotton & Godfrey, 1938) (original combination)
- Onustus javanicus Gray, 1850: synonym of Xenophora solarioides (Reeve, 1845)
- Onustus peronianus Iredale, 1929: synonym of Xenophora peroniana (Iredale, 1929) (original combination)
- † Onustus prognatus Finlay, 1926: synonym of † Xenophora prognata (Finlay, 1926)
