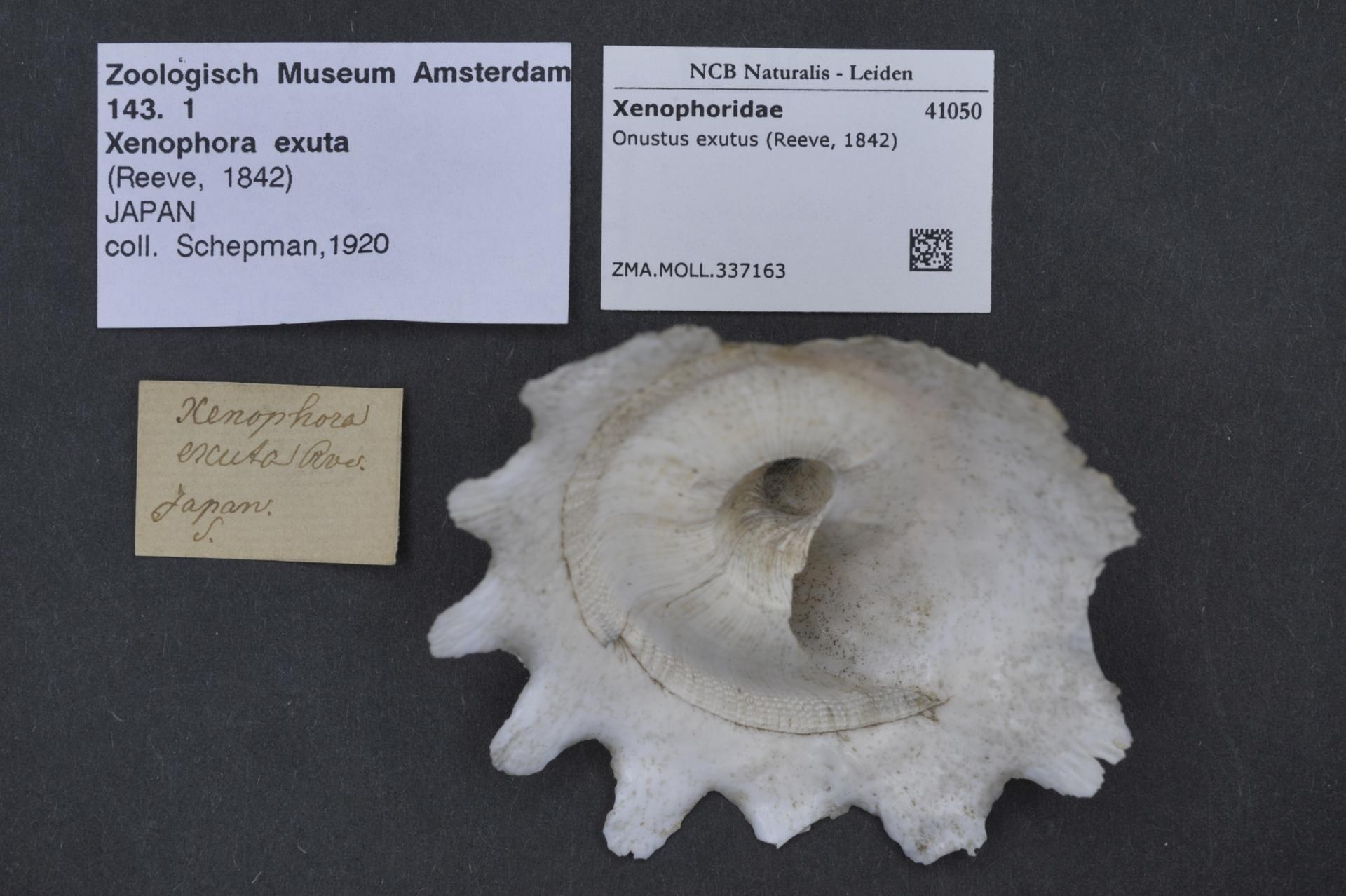

Scientific classification
- Kingdom: Animalia
- Phylum: Mollusca
- Class: Gastropoda
- Subclass: Caenogastropoda
- Order: Littorinimorpha
- Superfamily: Xenophoroidea
- Family: Xenophoridae
- Genus: Onustus
- Species: O. exutus

Binomial name
- Onustus exutus (Reeve, 1842)

Synonyms
- Phorus exutus Reeve, 1842; Xenophora (Onustus) exuta (Reeve, 1842) ·

= Onustus exutus =

Species of gastropod

Onustus exutus is a species of large sea snail, a marine gastropod mollusk in the family Xenophoridae, the carrier shells.

== Description ==
Length of the shell of the fossil species: 14 mm; its diameter 45.5 mm.

The fossils, found at Fiji, retain patches of their original shell that show the obliquely curved striae and grooves of Onustus exutus and the broad curved axial plicae present on many extant shells of that species. The fossils, however, show far more numerous attachment scars on the whorls of the spire than could be found on any Holocene shell. The narrow band of revolving striae is present, as on shells of O. exutus, but between this band and the umbilicus the nearly flat surface is covered by closely set spiral ribs that are beaded by shallow curved radial grooves.

== Distribution ==
Onustus exustus occurs in the Central Indo-Pacific from southern Japan to southern Indonesia, tropical Western Australia, northern Australia and Papua. It can be found between 18 and 340 m.

Fossils have been found in Pliocene strata on Fiji.
