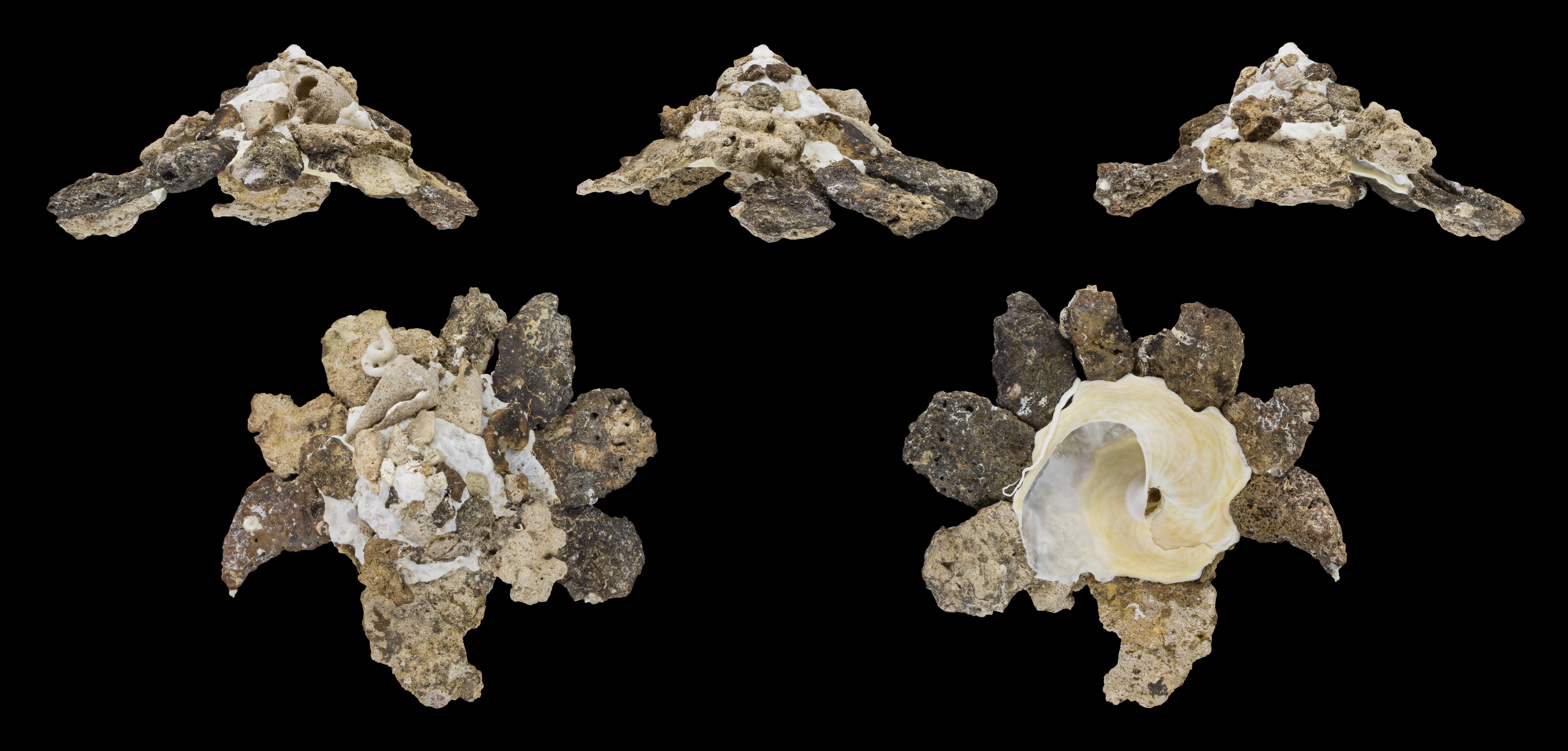

Scientific classification
- Kingdom: Animalia
- Phylum: Mollusca
- Class: Gastropoda
- Subclass: Caenogastropoda
- Order: Littorinimorpha
- Family: Xenophoridae
- Genus: Xenophora
- Species: X. cerea

Binomial name
- Xenophora cerea (Reeve, 1845)

Synonyms
- Phorus cereus Reeve, 1845; Xenophora torrida Kuroda & Ito, 1961

= Xenophora cerea =

Species of gastropod

Xenophora cerea is a species of large sea snail, a marine gastropod mollusc in the family Xenophoridae, the carrier shells.
