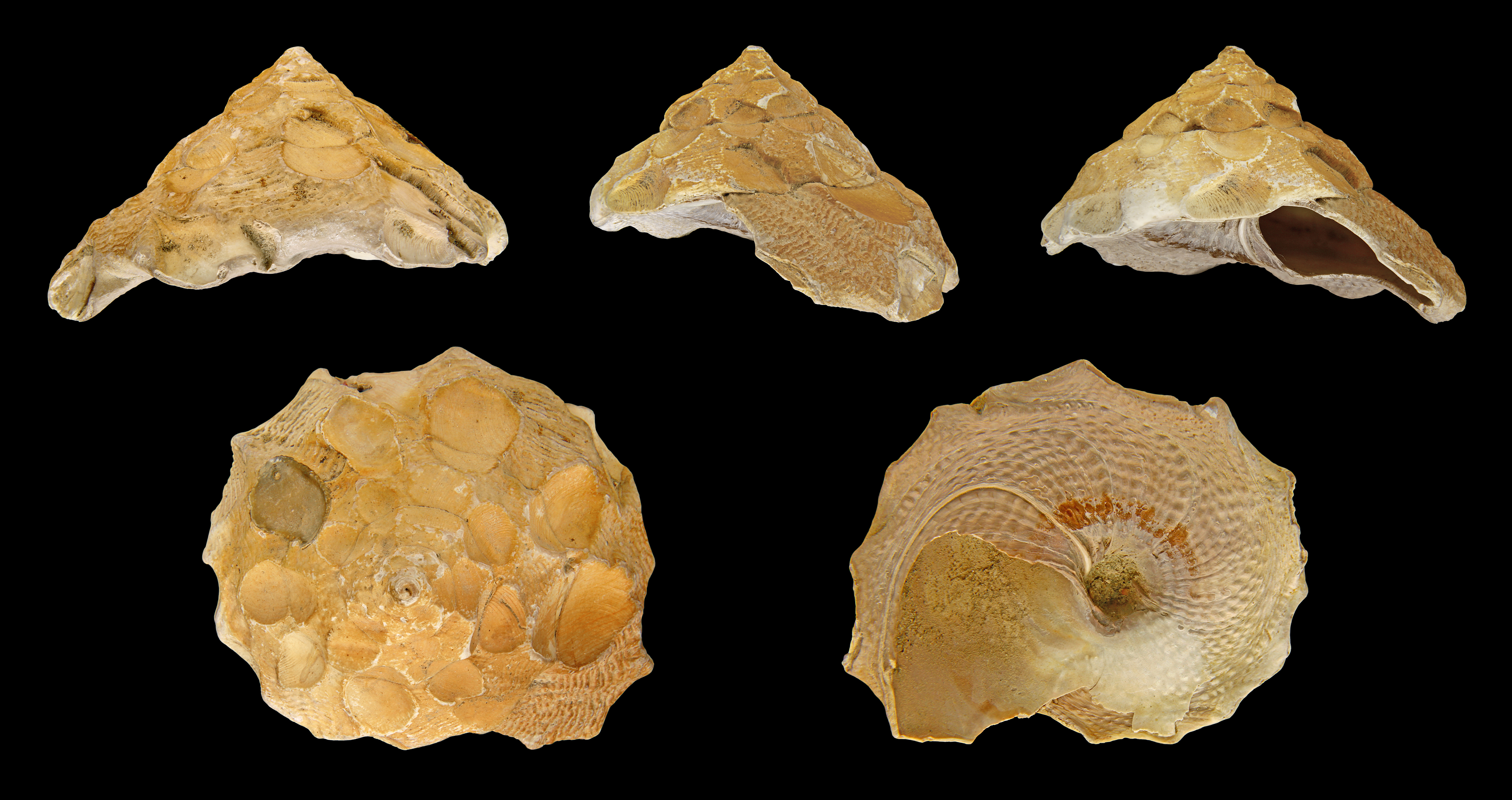

Scientific classification
- Kingdom: Animalia
- Phylum: Mollusca
- Class: Gastropoda
- Subclass: Caenogastropoda
- Order: Littorinimorpha
- Family: Xenophoridae
- Genus: Xenophora
- Species: X. crispa

Binomial name
- Xenophora crispa (König, 1825)

Synonyms
- Trochus crispus König, 1825; Xenophora (Xenophora) crispa (König, 1825) · accepted, alternate representation; Xenophora mediterranea Tiberi, 1863

= Xenophora crispa =

Xenophora crispa Temporal range: Pliocene – Recent

Species of gastropod

Xenophora crispa, the Mediterranean Carrier Shell, is a species of large sea snail, a marine gastropod mollusk in the family Xenophoridae, the carrier shells.

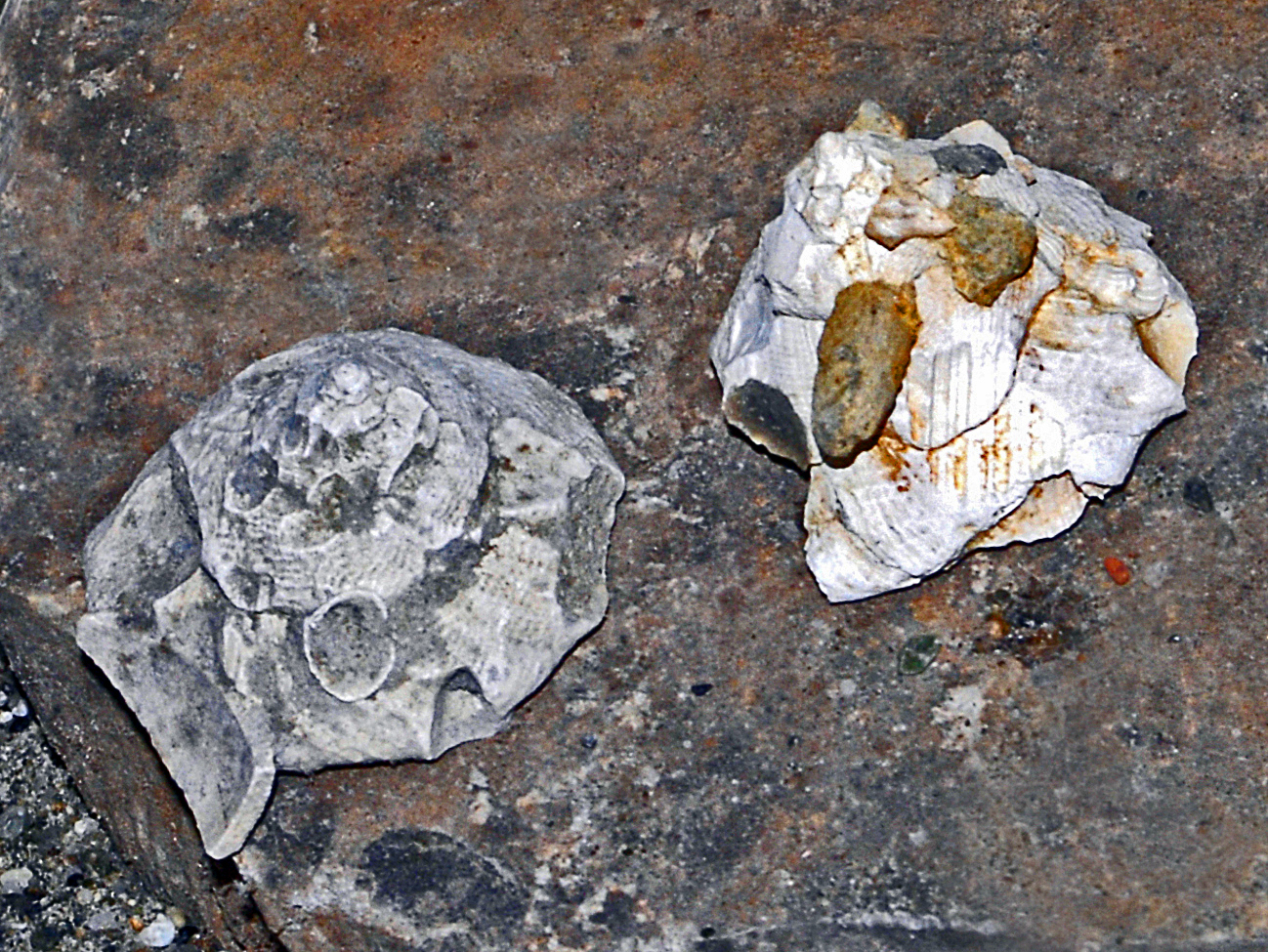
Fossils of Xenophora crispa from Pliocene of Italy

== Fossil record ==
There are currently 16 known species in the genus, Xenophora. Fossils of Xenophora crispa are found in marine strata of Pliocene of Italy and Spain (age range: from 3.6 to 2.588 million years ago.). The Pliocene stage is the last stage of the Tertiary period before the Quaternary ice ages. This stage was the final of global cooling. Fossils of the genus Xenophora are found in marine strata from Cretaceous to Quaternary (age range : 89.3 to 0.012 million years). Although Xenophora crispa are found specifically in Italy and in Spain, fossils from the genus Xenophora can be found all over the world.

== Description ==
Shells of Xenophora crispa can reach a size of 30–63 millimetres (1.2–2.5 in). They are trochoid, depressed-conical shells, non-porcellanous ventrally, with narrow peripheral edge and 7-8 whorls decorated with irregular spirals wrinkles. The shell of this species consists of aragonitic crossed lamellar fabric. The base is slightly concave. Foreign objects are usually attached to all whorls of these shells, usually mollusk shells, pebbles, or small pieces of coral rock. The Mediterranean Carrier Shell uses these fragments for tactile and olfactory camouflage (attachments of other shells look like jumbles of shells on seafloor to predators). This specific camouflage is used because Xenophora crispa are found in shallow waters. Deeper water species of this genus use their attachments to not sink into the muck below them. Fragments can also be used to strengthen its rather fragile shell. Prismatic microstructures mediate the attachment areas of the foreign objects on the shell of the Xenophora crispa. Some of the species in the genus Xenophora only attract one to two foreign object on their shell, while other species, like the Xenophora crispa are completely covered.

== Distribution ==
This marine species is present in the Mediterranean Sea and off West Africa to Angola. This species is often found on continental shelves and slopes. They are mostly found in benthic zones, the bottom of the body of water. They are found in subtropical waters (temperature range: from 10 degrees Celsius to 24 degrees Celsius). Found in the bibliography (on the EOL site) you can find a map that shows the global distribution of the 16 species that make up the genus Xenophora.

== Diet ==
All species in the genus Xenophora are detritivores (and heterotrophic, meaning they do not produce their own food). Detritivores feed on dead organic material, most commonly plant detritus. All detritivores are important in their ecosystems because they cycle nutrients in the carbon, nitrogen, and phosphorus cycle.

== Life Stages ==
This species start as embryos and then develop into planktonic trochophore larvae which are small, clear, free-swimming larvae. Their swimming is enabled by a prototroch (a sensory plate). After the larvae stage they go into their dominant larvae phase, juvenile veligers. Later, they become a full grown adult.

== Movement ==
Similarly to other gastropods, Xenophora crispa move across the seafloor using locomotion. They do this using their singular anterior foot.

== Reproduction ==
Xenophora crispa are gonochoric which means they have two sexes, male and female. They spawn using the method of broadcast spawning, releasing egg and sperm into the water and then fertilization occurs.

== Bibliography ==
- Crippa, Gaia; Pasinetti, Giovanni; Dapiaggi, Monica (2020). "How did the carrier shell Xenophora crispa (König, 1825) build its shell? Evidence from the Recent and fossil record". Lethaia. 53 (4): 439–451. Bibcode:2020Letha..53..439C. doi:10.1111/let.12367. hdl:2434/701063. S2CID 213541526.
- “Critter of the Week: Xenophora (Xenophora) Neozelanica Neozelanica - the Shell Collector.” NIWA, 17 Feb. 2021, https://niwa.co.nz/blogs/critteroftheweek/164.
- Editors, By: BD, et al. “Detritivore - Definition, Function and Examples.” Biology Dictionary, 27 Mar. 2019, https://biologydictionary.net/detritivore/.
- Pliocene Quick Guide, https://www.esd.ornl.gov/projects/qen/pliocene.html.
- Ponder W.F. (1983). A revision of the Recent Xenophoridae of the World and of the Australian Fossil Species (Mollusca : Gastropoda). Memoir 17. The Australian Museum Sydney, Australia.
- Rafferty, John. “Trochophore.” Encyclopædia Britannica, Encyclopædia Britannica, Inc., https://www.britannica.com/science/trochophore.
- Rafferty, John. “Trochophore.” Encyclopædia Britannica, Encyclopædia Britannica, Inc., https://www.britannica.com/science/trochophore.
- Ramalhosa, Patricio. “First Record of the Marine Snail Xenophora Crispa (Gastropoda: Xenophoridae) from Madeira Island (Northeastern Atlantic Ocean): First Record of Xenophora Crispa from Madeira Island.” Arquipelago - Life and Marine Sciences, 2022, https://revistas.rcaap.pt/arquipelago/article/view/25458.
- “Smithsonian National Museum of Natural History.” Invertebrate Zoology Collections Search, https://collections.nmnh.si.edu/search/iz/?ark=ark%3A%2F65665%2F30cfcb5ea7abe416eb2f6f792633f7b20.
- Tenorio, Manuel; Afonso, C. (October 2013). "A New Cone Species from Aruba: Perplexiconus wendrosi sp. nov. (Gastropoda, Conilithidae)". Xenophora Taxonomy (Supplément).
- Decuir, Jessica T.; Dixson, Adrienne D. (2004). ""So when It Comes out, They Aren't That Surprised That It is There": Using Critical Race Theory as a Tool of Analysis of Race and Racism in Education". Educational Researcher. 33 (5): 26–31. doi:10.3102/0013189X033005026. JSTOR 3699853. S2CID 56136020.
- “Xenophora Crispa (König, 1825).” Xenophora Crispa, Curly Carrier Shell, https://www.sealifebase.ca/summary/Xenophora-crispa.html.
- “Xenophora Pallidula (Reeve, 1842).” Xenophora Pallidula, Pallid Carrier-Shell, https://www.sealifebase.ca/summary/Xenophora-pallidula.html.
- “Xenophora.” EOL, https://eol.org/pages/53299.
- “Xenophora.” Zymoglyphic Museum, http://www.zymoglyphic.org/exhibits/xenophora.html.
