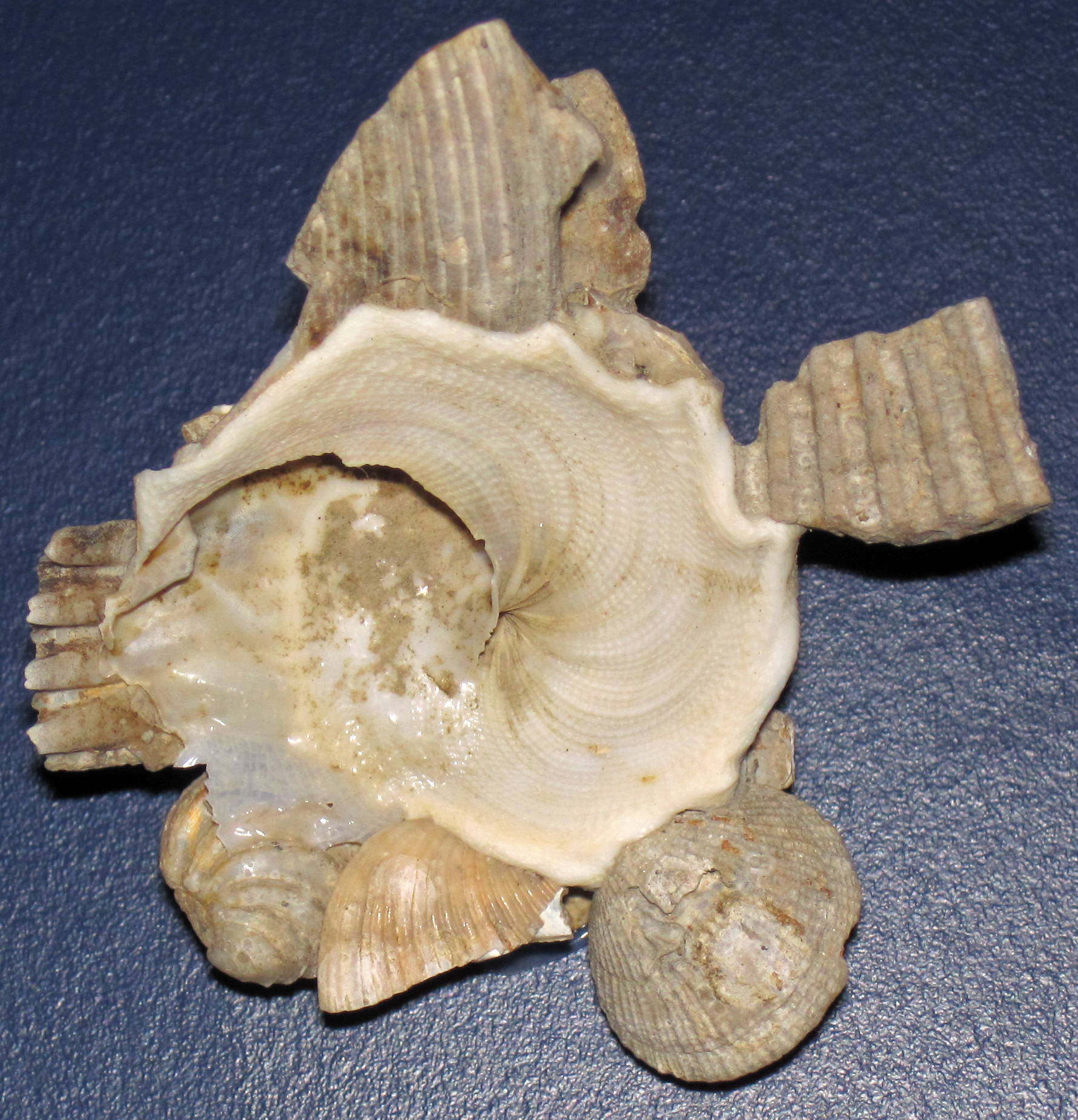

Scientific classification
- Kingdom: Animalia
- Phylum: Mollusca
- Class: Gastropoda
- Subclass: Caenogastropoda
- Order: Littorinimorpha
- Family: Xenophoridae
- Genus: Xenophora
- Species: X. japonica

Binomial name
- Xenophora japonica Kuroda & Habe, 1971

Synonyms
- Xenophora japonica Kuroda & Habe, 1971

= Xenophora japonica =

Species of gastropod

Xenophora japonica is a species of large sea snail, a marine gastropod mollusc in the family Xenophoridae, the carrier shells.
