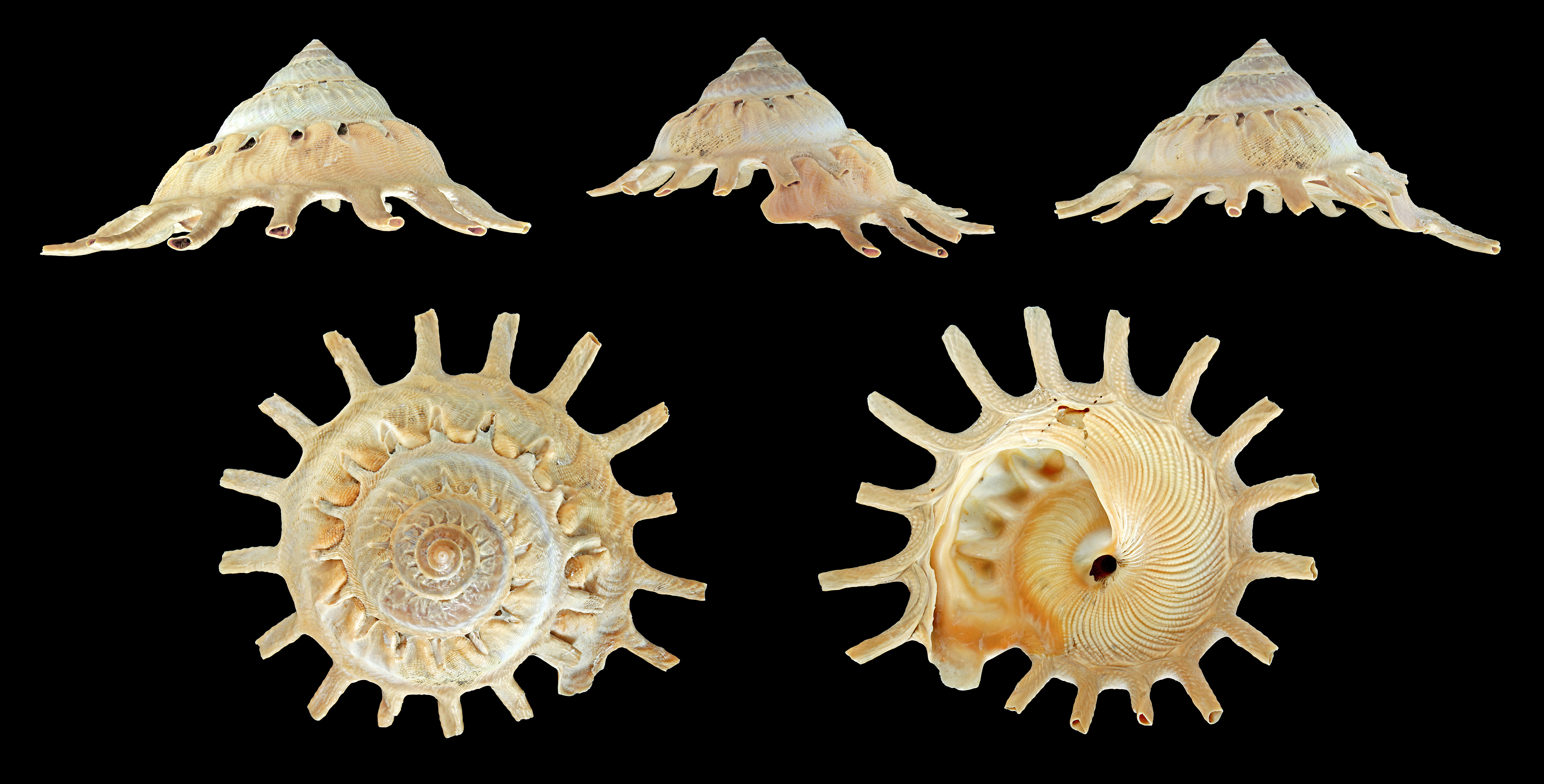
- Five views of a shell of Stellaria solaris

Scientific classification
- Kingdom: Animalia
- Phylum: Mollusca
- Class: Gastropoda
- Subclass: Caenogastropoda
- Order: Littorinimorpha
- Family: Xenophoridae
- Genus: Stellaria
- Species: S. solaris

Binomial name
- Stellaria solaris (Linnaeus, 1764)

Synonyms
- Astraea polaris Röding, 1798; Stellaria solaris paucispinosa Kosuge & Nomoto, 1972; Trochus solaris Linnaeus, 1764

= Stellaria solaris =

Species of gastropod

Stellaria solaris, the sun carrier shell, is a species of large sea snail, a marine gastropod mollusc in the family Xenophoridae, the carrier shells.

== Description ==
Stellaria solaris has 10-20 long, thin protrusions on its shell that allow it to lift itself off the bottom of the seafloor in order to graze. These symmetrical, radial protrusions also make the shell structure more stable, as they make the effective shell area larger. The shell is about 105 mm (4 in) in diameter with its protrusions. It has been noted that the protrusions often make up about 45% of the shell’s diameter and protrude at 90 degree angles from the outside edge of the peripheral area of the shell. Certain specimens have been described as having thick and high spires with an ovular shell opening. The shell has a spire angle of 92-102 degrees, making it depressed. The whorls and base of the shell are convex, and the shell is often a light yellow-brown color all over. Fragments of the shells of snails that die accumulate and become shallow marine sediments.

== Distribution ==
Stellaria solaris is a marine species located in benthic waters from 0–250 feet deep on continental shelves and slopes. This species is distributed along the Indo-West Pacific, the Red Sea, and the Persian Gulf in mostly tropical or temperate waters. Studies have found this species in the Sarawak Exclusive Economic Zone off the coast of Malaysia and off the Southeast coast of India, to name examples. This species has been found on muddy substrates.

== Feeding ==
Sun carrier shells are mobile creatures that filter detritus and foraminifera from the sediment they live on. Silt also may accumulate in the gut cavities of these snails. Interestingly, the left salivary gland is about twice as long as the right salivary gland. Certain species in the family Xenophoridae bury their feces in the substrate with their snouts, so it is possible the sun carrier shell does this as well. It is suggested that this behavior may aid in camouflage. The shells may also be camouflaged by the stance in which they feed – the foot is lifted over the ground they are on.

== Reproduction and life cycle ==
Stellaria solaris take part in sexual reproduction. They are most likely gonochoric, meaning an individual can only be one sex or the other. Larvae are likely planktonic before growing into juvenile veligers and finally into benthic adults. It is possible that the planktonic stage occurs over a long time period due to the large geographic range of distribution. Not much is known about reproduction of shells in the family Xenophoridae, but the embryonic mollusc shell, or protoconch, of certain shells in the family Xenophoridae are small and have many spirals.

== Locomotion ==
Stellaria solaris moves by using rhythmic muscular contractions that allow it to glide over its own secreted mucus. Like other snails in the family Xenophoridae, the sun carrier shell likely places its foot on the substrate, lifts its shell off the substrate by extending the muscular column, jerks its shell forward, and places its shell back down on the substrate. The muscular foot can lift to be the same height or higher than the shell and can lift 2-3 times the weight of the creature. Some species in the family Xenophoridae can move about 233.5 cm per day, so it is likely that Stellaria solaris has a similar range. Scientists note that the method of locomotion – the shell masks the actual animal inside – may help camouflage the snail from predators.

== Shell-building ==
The sun carrier shell, like other snails in the family Xenophoridae, attaches fragments of other materials found in the ocean to its shell, such as gravel, rocks, coral particles, pebbles, or shells of other snails or clams, and this is where the name “carrier shell’ comes from. This mechanism is thought to be used to camouflage it from predators based on how the shell feels and smells. Or, the additional materials on its shell could help its stability against the current. It has been found that unlike many other carrier shells, Stellaria solaris does not have a lot of external fragments attached to its shell, but it does have some. External objects are often only attached to the first 2.5-4 whorls of the shell and tend to be small. The snail uses its proboscis or foot to move the fragments onto the shell, then cements the fragments, and finally adds sand or debris to fully seal the fragments to the shell.
