= Xenophora senegalensis =

Scientific classification
- Kingdom: Animalia
- Phylum: Mollusca
- Class: Gastropoda
- Subclass: Caenogastropoda
- Order: Littorinimorpha
- Family: Xenophoridae
- Genus: Xenophora
- Species: X. senegalensis

Binomial name
- Xenophora senegalensis Fischer, 1873

Synonyms
- Xenophora caperata Petit de la Saussaye, 1857; Xenophora cavelieri Rochebrune, 1883

Species of gastropod

Xenophora senegalensis is a species of large sea snail, a marine gastropod mollusk in the family Xenophoridae, the carrier shells.
