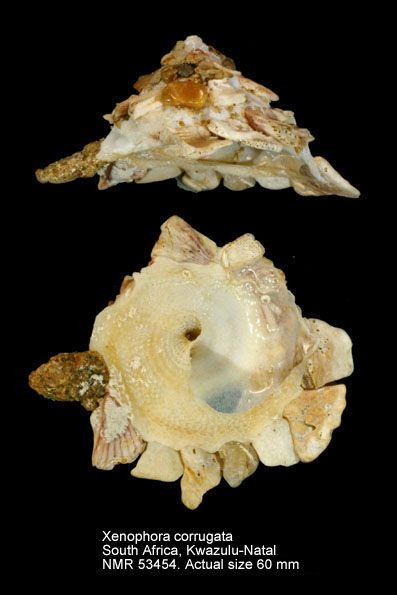
- Preserved specimen

Scientific classification
- Kingdom: Animalia
- Phylum: Mollusca
- Class: Gastropoda
- Subclass: Caenogastropoda
- Order: Littorinimorpha
- Family: Xenophoridae
- Genus: Xenophora
- Species: X. corrugata

Binomial name
- Xenophora corrugata (Reeve, 1842)

Synonyms
- Phorus corrugatus Reeve, 1842; Xenophora tulearensis Stewart & Kosuge, 1993; Xenophorus caperatus Philippi, 1849

= Xenophora corrugata =

Species of gastropod

Xenophora corrugata is a species of large sea snail, a marine gastropod mollusk in the family Xenophoridae, the carrier shells.

== Description ==
The length of the shell attains 35 mm, its diameter 38.5 mm.

The spire is moderately high, broadly convex, bearing strong diagonal wrinkles. The base is deeply concave, its surface covered by close-set spiral ribs that are beaded by low curved radials, resulting in a corrugated surface.

== Distribution ==
Species have been found in Fiji, Australia, Japan, and the Indian Ocean.

Fossils have been found in Pliocene strata in Fiji.
