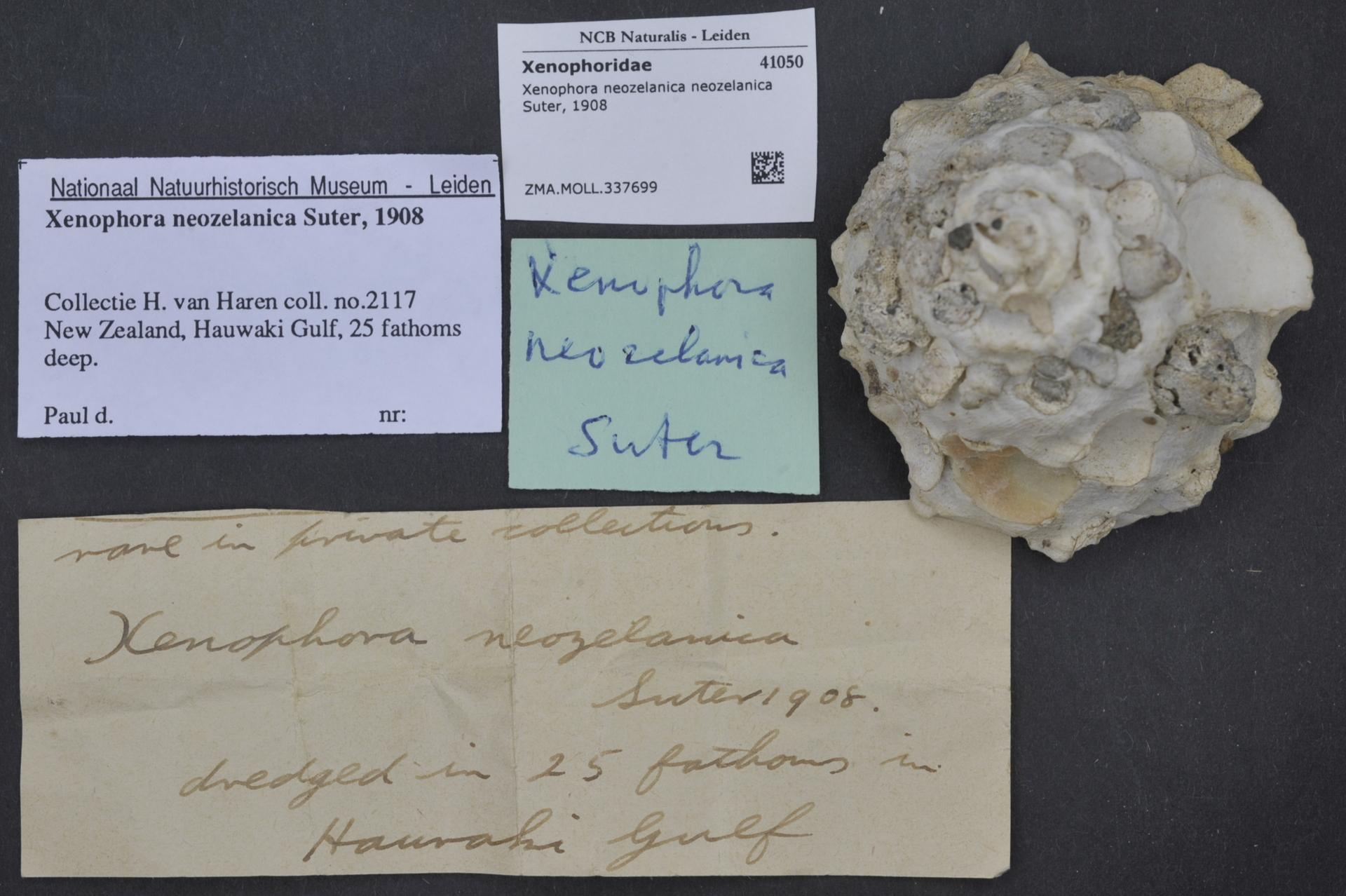
- Preserved specimen

Scientific classification
- Kingdom: Animalia
- Phylum: Mollusca
- Class: Gastropoda
- Subclass: Caenogastropoda
- Order: Littorinimorpha
- Family: Xenophoridae
- Genus: Xenophora
- Species: X. neozelanica

Binomial name
- Xenophora neozelanica Suter, 1908

Synonyms
- Onustus neozelanicus Finlay, 1927

= Xenophora neozelanica =

Species of gastropod

Xenophora neozelanica, is a species of medium-sized sea snail, a marine gastropod mollusc in the family Xenophoridae, the carrier snails or carrier shells.
