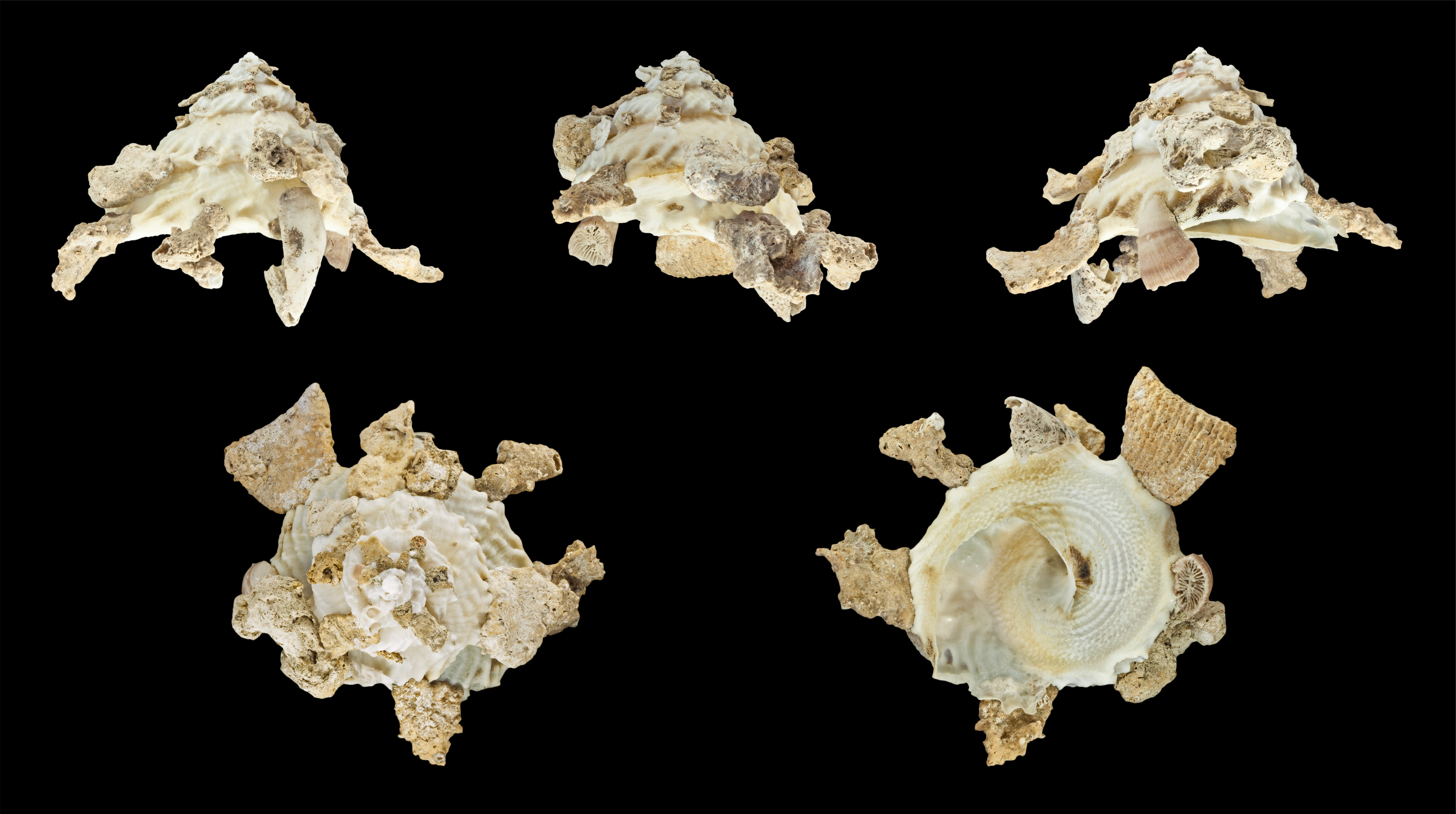
- Xenophora mekranensis konoi

Scientific classification
- Kingdom: Animalia
- Phylum: Mollusca
- Class: Gastropoda
- Subclass: Caenogastropoda
- Order: Littorinimorpha
- Family: Xenophoridae
- Genus: Xenophora
- Species: X. mekranensis

Binomial name
- Xenophora mekranensis (Newton, 1905)

Synonyms
- Tugurium mekranense Newton, 1905

= Xenophora mekranensis =

Species of gastropod

Xenophora mekranensis is a species of large sea snail, a marine gastropod mollusc in the family Xenophoridae, the carrier shells.
