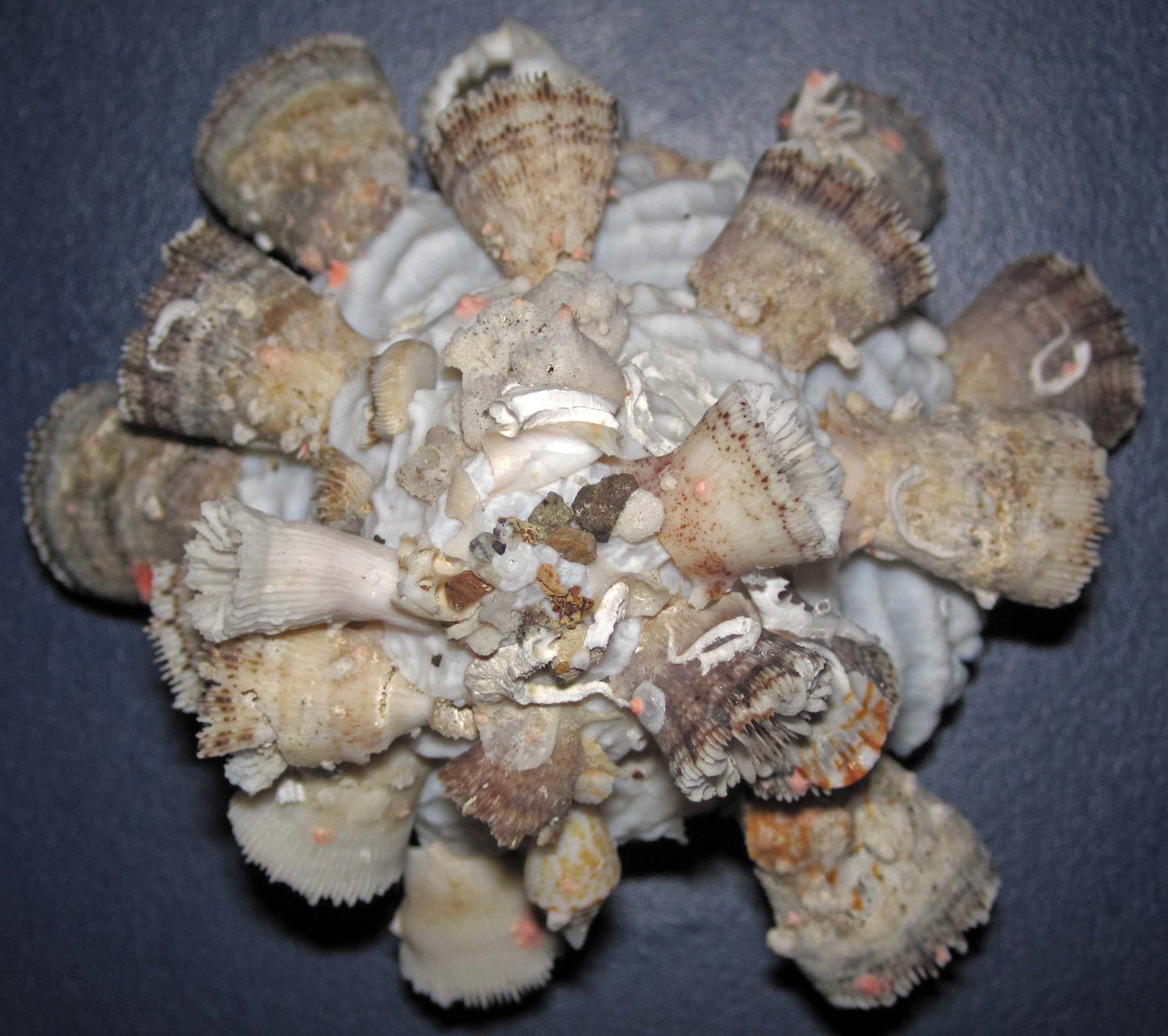

Scientific classification
- Kingdom: Animalia
- Phylum: Mollusca
- Class: Gastropoda
- Subclass: Caenogastropoda
- Order: Littorinimorpha
- Family: Xenophoridae
- Genus: Xenophora
- Species: X. granulosa

Binomial name
- Xenophora granulosa Ponder, 1983

Synonyms
- Xenophora regularis Habe & Okutani, 1983

= Xenophora granulosa =

Species of gastropod

Xenophora granulosa is a species of large sea snail, a marine gastropod mollusk in the family Xenophoridae, the carrier shells.
