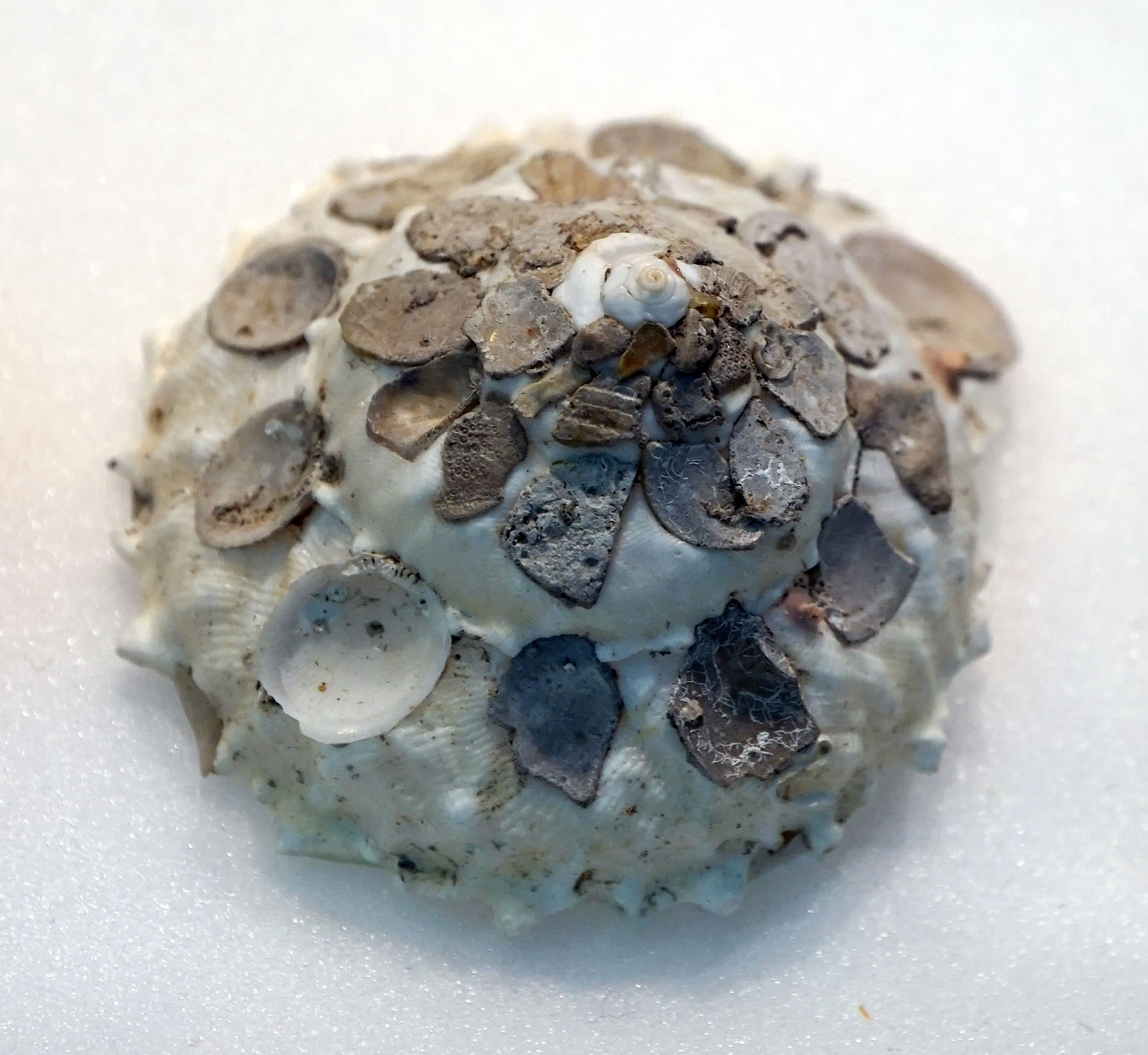

Scientific classification
- Kingdom: Animalia
- Phylum: Mollusca
- Class: Gastropoda
- Subclass: Caenogastropoda
- Order: Littorinimorpha
- Family: Xenophoridae
- Genus: Xenophora
- Species: X. tenuis

Binomial name
- Xenophora tenuis Fulton, 1983

Synonyms
- Xenophora tenuis Hirase, 1934

= Xenophora tenuis =

Species of gastropod

Xenophora tenuis is a species of large sea snail, a marine gastropod mollusk in the family Xenophoridae, the carrier shells.
