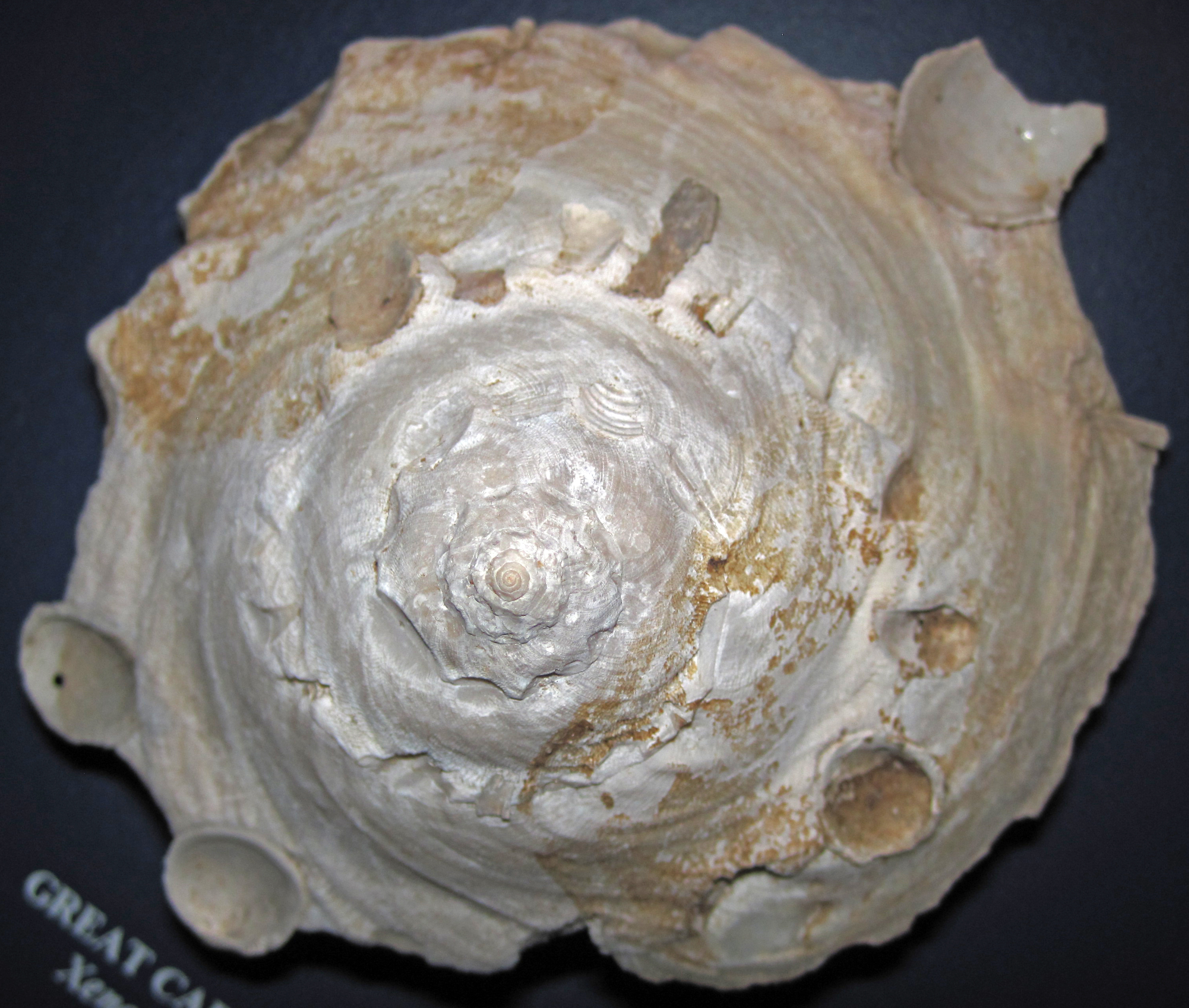

Scientific classification
- Kingdom: Animalia
- Phylum: Mollusca
- Class: Gastropoda
- Subclass: Caenogastropoda
- Order: Littorinimorpha
- Family: Xenophoridae
- Genus: Stellaria
- Species: S. gigantea

Binomial name
- Stellaria gigantea (Schepman, 1909)

Synonyms
- Trochotugurium giganteum (Schepman, 1909); Tugurium giganteum (Schepman, 1909); Xenophora gigantea (Schepman, 1909)

= Stellaria gigantea =

Species of gastropod

Stellaria gigantea is a species of large sea snail, a marine gastropod mollusc in the family Xenophoridae, the carrier shells.
