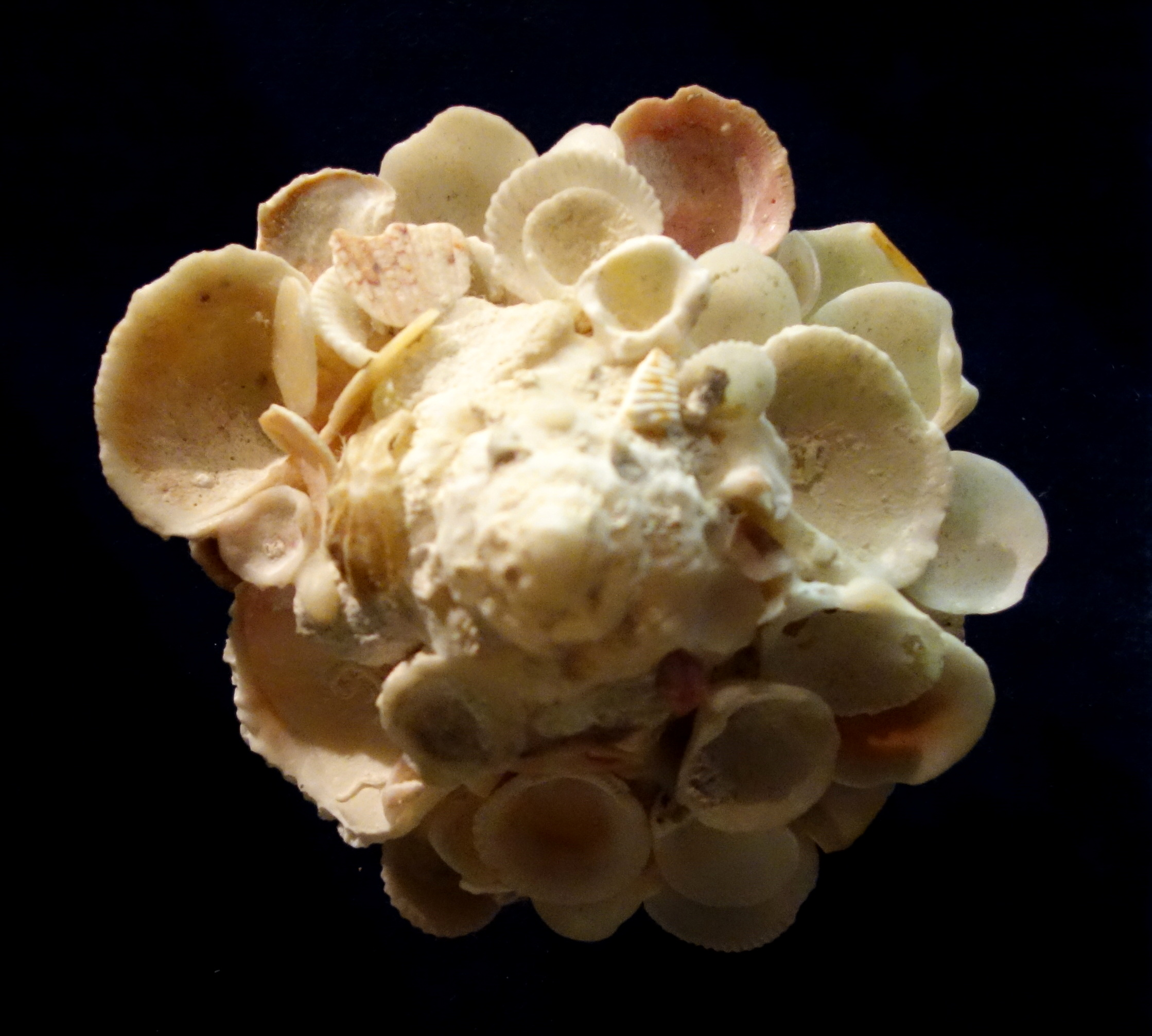
- An apical view of a shell of Xenophora conchyliophora with bivalve valves as attachments

Scientific classification
- Kingdom: Animalia
- Phylum: Mollusca
- Class: Gastropoda
- Subclass: Caenogastropoda
- Order: Littorinimorpha
- Family: Xenophoridae
- Genus: Xenophora
- Species: X. conchyliophora

Binomial name
- Xenophora conchyliophora (Born, 1780)

Synonyms
- Astraea lapidifera Röding, 1798; Phorus onustus Reeve, 1842; Trochus conchyliophorus Born, 1780; Xenophora laevigata Fischer von Waldheim, 1807; Xenophora meandrina Fischer von Waldheim, 1807; Xenophora tricostata Fischer von Waldheim, 1807; Xenophora vulcanica Fischer von Waldheim, 1807

= Xenophora conchyliophora =

Species of gastropod

Xenophora conchyliophora is a species of medium-sized to large sea snail, a marine gastropod mollusk in the family Xenophoridae, the carrier shells.

== Distribution ==
This is a Western Atlantic species.

== Description ==
The maximum recorded shell length for this species is 72 mm.

== Habitat ==
The minimum recorded depth for this species is 0 m; maximum recorded depth is 635 m.

== See also ==
- Images of a live Xenophora conchyliophora, photographed in situ underwater by Anne DuPont
