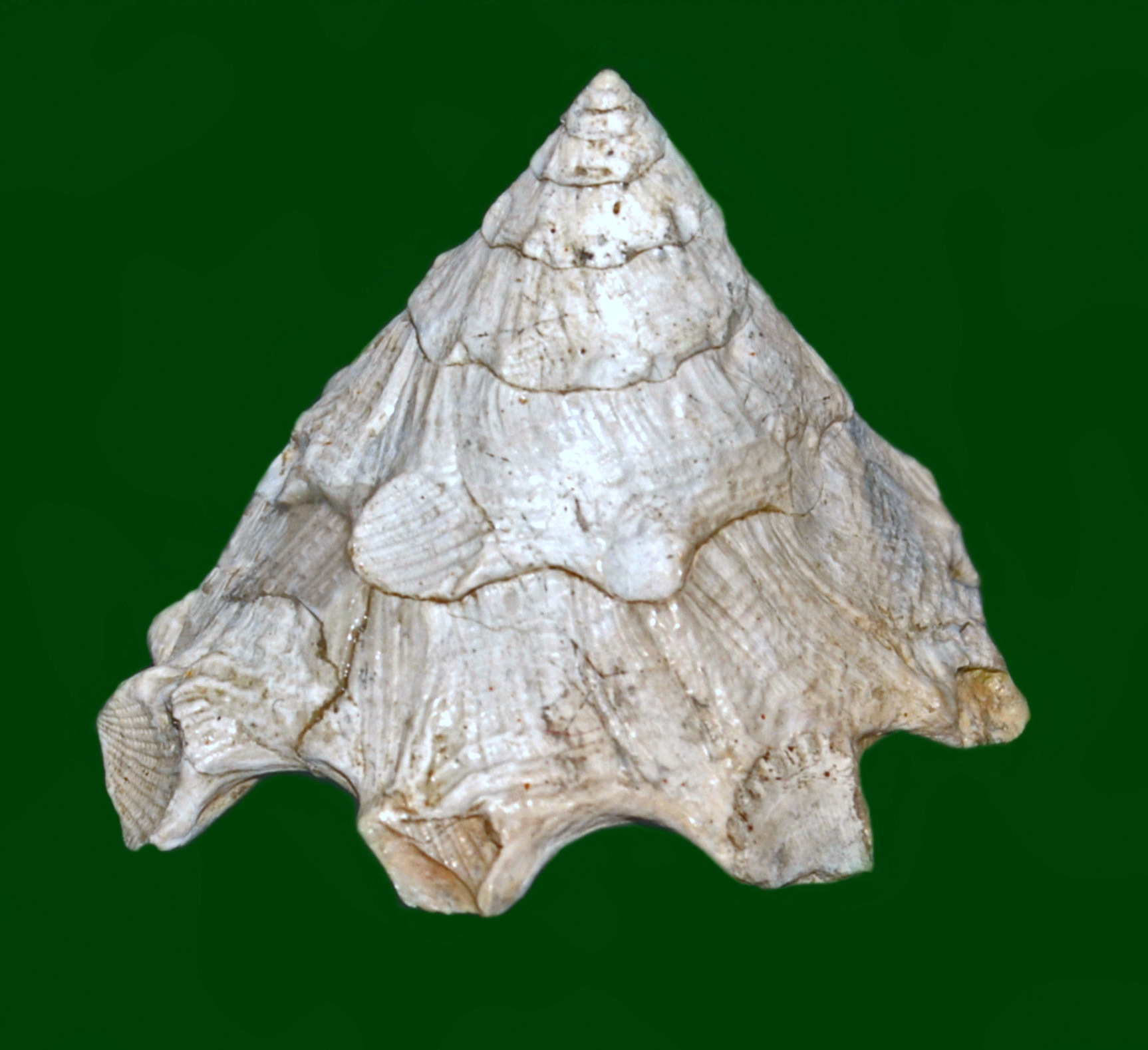
- A view of a fossil shell of Stellaria testigera

Scientific classification
- Kingdom: Animalia
- Phylum: Mollusca
- Class: Gastropoda
- Subclass: Caenogastropoda
- Order: Littorinimorpha
- Family: Xenophoridae
- Genus: Stellaria
- Species: S. testigera

Binomial name
- Stellaria testigera (Bronn, 1831)

Synonyms
- Phorus testigerus Bronn, 1831; Xenophora (Stellaria) testigera (Bronn, 1831)

= Stellaria testigera =

Stellaria testigera Temporal range: Miocene - Pliocene

Species of gastropod

Stellaria testigera, the finger carrier shell, is a species of large sea snail, a marine gastropod mollusk in the family Xenophoridae, the carrier shells.

== Subspecies ==
- Stellaria testigera profunda Ponder, 1983
- Stellaria testigera digitata Martens, 1878

== Distribution ==
Stellaria testigera profunda is present in the Gulf of Aden and in North East Africa, while Stellaria testigera digitata can be found in Senegal and Western Africa.

== Description ==
Shells of Stellaria testigera profunda can reach a size of 45–80 millimetres (1.8–3.1 in), while in Stellaria testigera digitata they can reach 50–75 millimetres (2.0–3.0 in). These shells are characterized by the expanded peripherical flange, the presence of digitations and the smooth dorsal surface.

== Fossil record ==
Fossils of Stellaria testigera are found in marine strata from the Miocene to Pliocene (age range: from 20.43 to 3.6 million years ago.). Fossils are known from Italy, Denmark and Slovakia. These mollusks lived in the Mediterranean and spread to the Atlantic Africa and the Gulf of Aden.
