= Stellaria lamberti =

Scientific classification
- Kingdom: Animalia
- Phylum: Mollusca
- Class: Gastropoda
- Subclass: Caenogastropoda
- Order: Littorinimorpha
- Family: Xenophoridae
- Genus: Stellaria
- Species: S. lamberti

Binomial name
- Stellaria lamberti (Souverbie, 1871)

Synonyms
- Xenophora lamberti (Souverbie, 1871)

Species of gastropod

Stellaria lamberti is a species of large sea snail, a marine gastropod mollusc in the family Xenophoridae, the carrier shells.
