= Lamelliphoridae =

Scientific classification
- Kingdom: Animalia
- Phylum: Mollusca
- Class: Gastropoda
- Subclass: Caenogastropoda
- Order: Littorinimorpha
- Superfamily: Xenophoroidea
- Family: †Lamelliphoridae; Korobkov, 1960

Extinct family of gastropods

Lamelliphoridae is an extinct family of fossil sea snails, marine gastropod molluscs in the clade Littorinimorpha.

According to taxonomy of the Gastropoda by Bouchet & Rocroi (2005) the family Lamelliphoridae has no subfamilies.
