= Xenophora peroniana =

Scientific classification
- Kingdom: Animalia
- Phylum: Mollusca
- Class: Gastropoda
- Subclass: Caenogastropoda
- Order: Littorinimorpha
- Family: Xenophoridae
- Genus: Xenophora
- Species: X. peroniana

Binomial name
- Xenophora peroniana (Iredale, 1929)

Species of gastropod

Xenophora peroniana is a species of large sea snail, a marine gastropod mollusc in the family Xenophoridae, the carrier shells.

== Description ==
One reported specimen from New South Wales had 41.1 mm of height and 54.1 mm of diameter.

The shell is moderately elevated. The umbilicus is closed in adults, but narrowly open in juveniles. A row of foreign objects is very prominent, obscuring more than half of the dorsal surface. The base is slightly concave to almost flat, sculptured with fine, irregular, subspiral striae which run at almost right angles. The aperture lower lip is somewhat thickened in mature specimens, often with a distinct internal thickening in middle of lip and usually with a weakly sinuate edge. Color-wise, it is yellowish-white dorsally, with base yellowish-white and collabral lines of chocolate brown. The callus is white. The columella is white but with a brown blotch around umbilical region in many specimens.

== Subspecies ==
- Xenophora peroniana peroniana (Iredale, 1929), whose base is slightly to moderately concave, usually with brown radial markings. It is found in eastern Australia.
- Xenophora peroniana kondoi (Ponder, 1983), whose base is strongly concave, usually uniformly yellowish-white. It is found on the Hawaiian Islands.
