= Xenophora solarioides =

Scientific classification
- Kingdom: Animalia
- Phylum: Mollusca
- Class: Gastropoda
- Subclass: Caenogastropoda
- Order: Littorinimorpha
- Family: Xenophoridae
- Genus: Xenophora
- Species: X. solarioides

Binomial name
- Xenophora solarioides (Reeve, 1845)

Synonyms
- Onustus javanicus Gray, 1857; Phorus solarioides Reeve, 1845; Xenophora (Xenophora) solarioides (Reeve, 1845)· accepted, alternate representation; Xenophora australis Souverbie & Montrouzier, 1870; Xenophora solarioides solarioides (Reeve, 1845)· accepted, alternate representation

Species of gastropod

Xenophora solarioides is a species of large sea snail, a marine gastropod mollusc in the family Xenophoridae, the carrier shells.

Subspecies

- † Xenophora solarioides jezleri Cox, 1948
