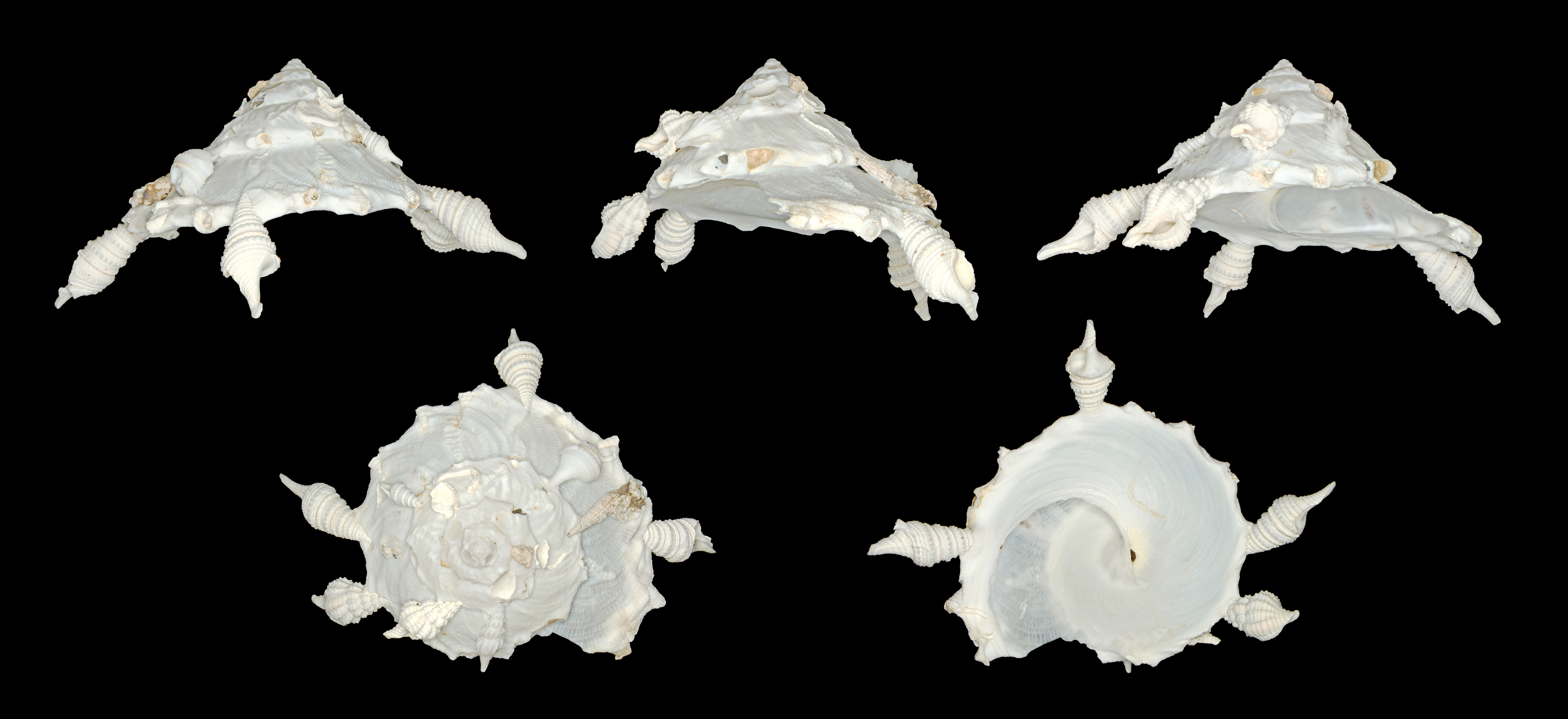
- Five views of a shell of Xenophora pallidula

Scientific classification
- Kingdom: Animalia
- Phylum: Mollusca
- Class: Gastropoda
- Subclass: Caenogastropoda
- Order: Littorinimorpha
- Family: Xenophoridae
- Genus: Xenophora
- Species: X. pallidula

Binomial name
- Xenophora pallidula (Reeve, 1842)

Synonyms
- Phorus pallidulus Reeve, 1842

= Xenophora pallidula =

Species of gastropod

Xenophora pallidula, the pallid carrier shell, is a species of large sea snail, a marine gastropod mollusc in the family Xenophoridae, the carrier shells.

== Description ==
Xenophora pallidula are relatively small, averaging about 68-78mm in length and 72-82mm in width. These snails have a light appearance, usually white or off-white in color. These snails get their name from the Latin word, Xenophoridae which means “foreign carrying”. In other words, these species will attach objects like coral skeletons, fragmented shells, and other debris to the dorsal side of their shell. These attachments often create a radial pattern around the whorls. While this is a commonality amongst the species in this family, Xenophora pallidula are known to cover more of their shell than other species in the family, with over half their shell hidden. And as the organism grows, there will be more and larger foreign material attached. This is not energetically favorable as the snails secrete mucus, which acts as a glue to hold the material in position. Yet the layout of the shell is a source of protection in various ways. The unique shell makes it harder to put into a predator's mouth and swallow. Additionally, due to the type of objects glued to the shell, it serves as a method of camouflage amongst any debris. A spire is also attached to the shell of these snails and only adds to its intricacy. Most have a fairly high spire, with a spire angle ranging between 65 and 92 degrees.

== Distribution ==
Xenophora pallidula was originally found in the Mascarene Basin in the Indian Ocean. Currently, they are found in tropical areas such as the Indo-Pacific ocean area. This species is commonly found in or near Australia, India, Nicobar Islands, Indonesia, Japan, Philippines and occasionally by South Africa. In these areas, the Xenophora pallidula is found in shallower waters of the benthic zone. They are commonly found at depths of 200 meters to 570 meters but can be as deep as 960 meters.

== Ecology ==
As a part of the Xenophora genus, Xenophora pallidula are grazers that feed upon detritus from the sea floor. The snails are able to acquire food since they are mobile, even though it is limited. This marine species reproduce sexually and externally but are not hermaphroditic. Rather have individuals that identify with a distinct sex and have specific reproduction organs for the entirety of their lifespan. Once reproduction has begun, embryos develop into planktonic trochophore, which is a young larvae and then into the final larval stage before becoming fully grown adults.
