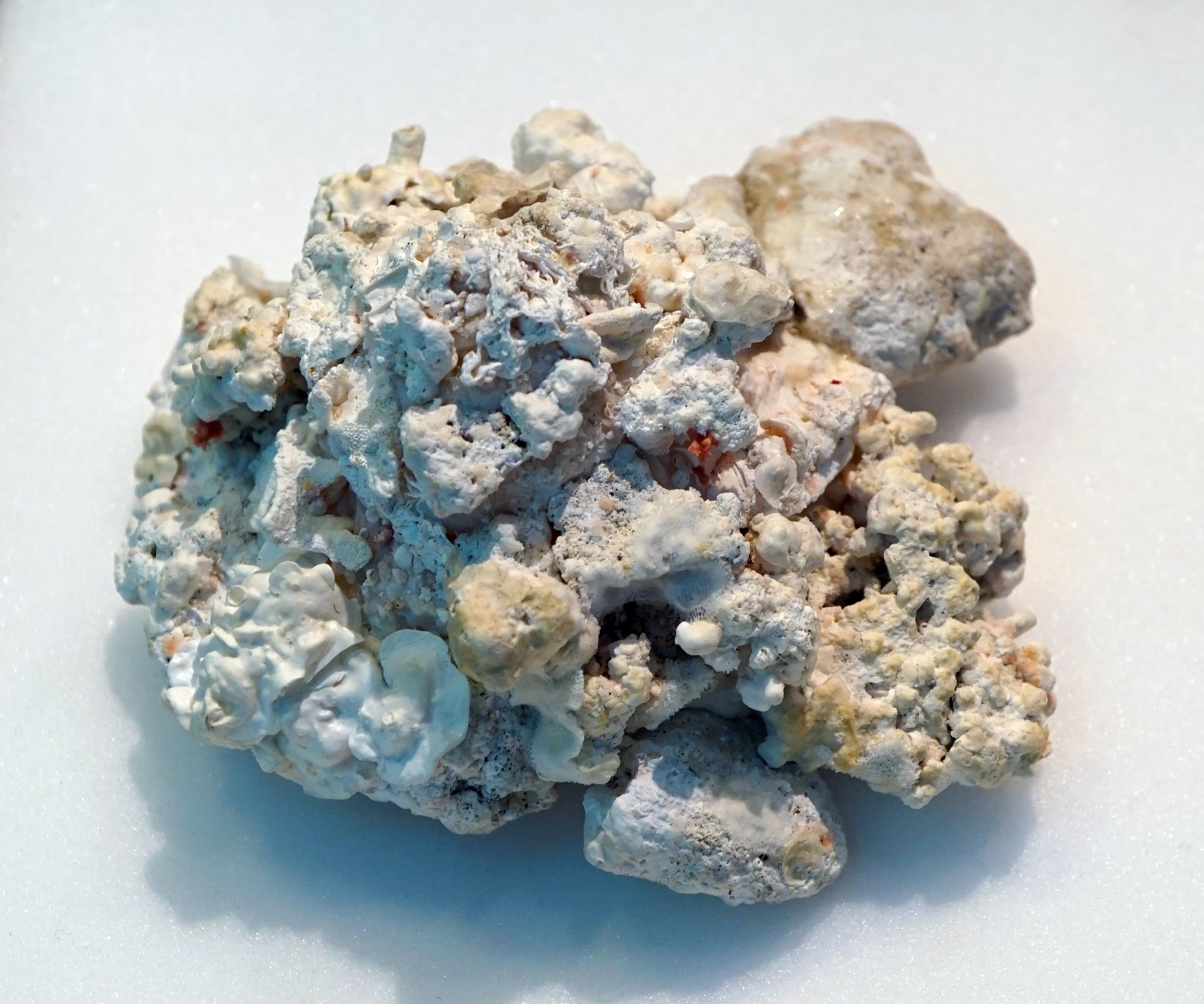

Scientific classification
- Kingdom: Animalia
- Phylum: Mollusca
- Class: Gastropoda
- Subclass: Caenogastropoda
- Order: Littorinimorpha
- Family: Xenophoridae
- Genus: Xenophora
- Species: X. flindersi

Binomial name
- Xenophora flindersi (Cotton & Godfrey, 1938)

Synonyms
- Onustus flindersi Cotton & Godfrey, 1938

= Xenophora flindersi =

Species of gastropod

Xenophora flindersi is a species of large sea snail, a marine gastropod mollusk in the family Xenophoridae, the carrier shells.
