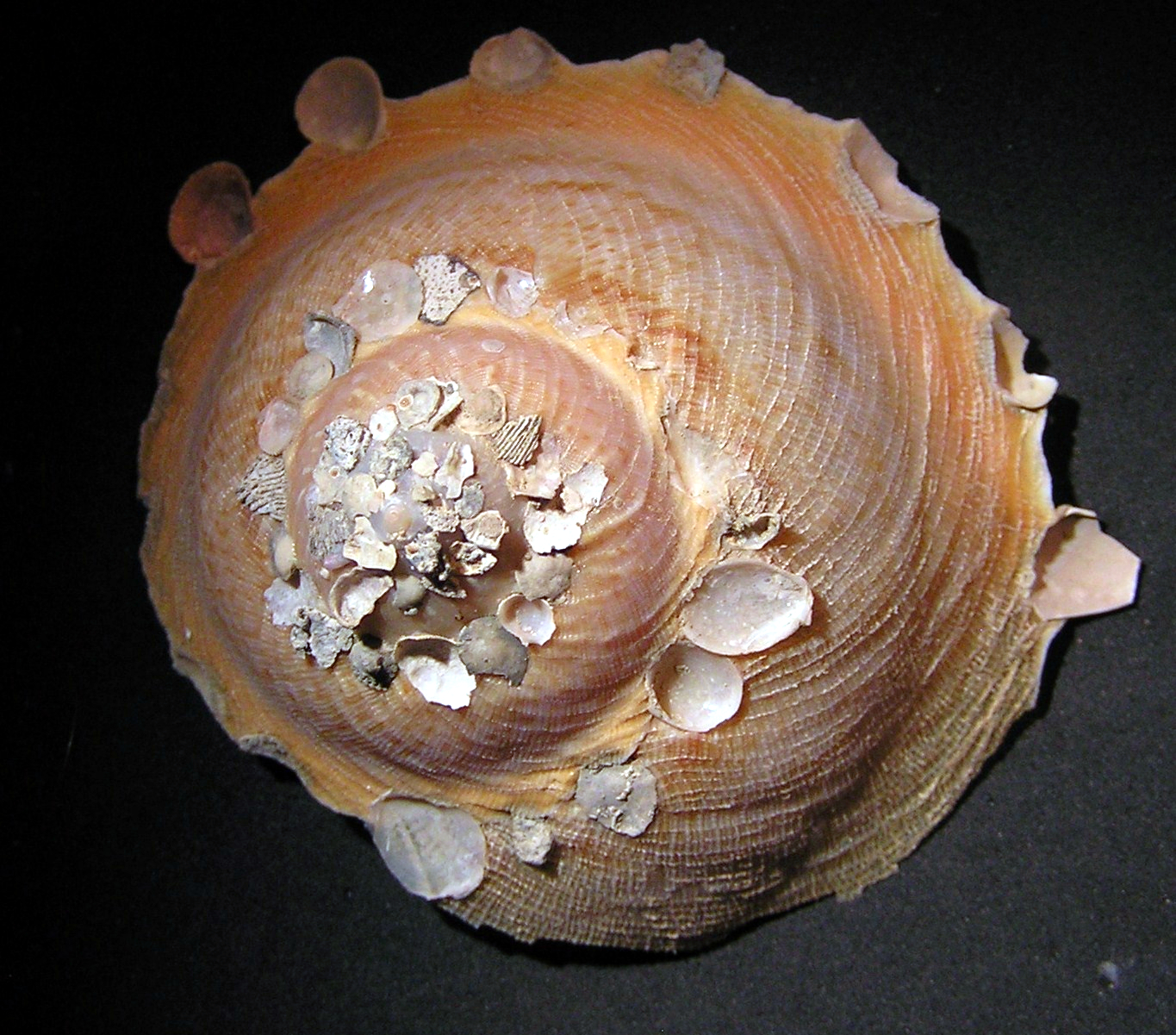
- Apical view of a shell of Stellaria chinensis

Scientific classification
- Kingdom: Animalia
- Phylum: Mollusca
- Class: Gastropoda
- Subclass: Caenogastropoda
- Order: Littorinimorpha
- Family: Xenophoridae
- Genus: Stellaria
- Species: S. chinensis

Binomial name
- Stellaria chinensis (Philippi, 1841)

Synonyms
- Phorus calculiferus Reeve, 1842; Trochus chinensis Philippi, 1841; Xenophora (Stellaria) chinensis (Philippi, 1841); Xenophora calculifera (Reeve, 1843)

= Stellaria chinensis =

Species of gastropod

Stellaria chinensis is a species of large sea snail, a marine gastropod mollusc in the family Xenophoridae, the carrier shells.

== Description ==
Similarly to other species within the family of the Carrier Shells, the beautiful sea snail collects objects from its environment including rocks, other shells, and debris to add to its own shell. However, the species is known for having little foreign material attached as compared to other morphological groups under the family Xenophoridae. The species has a depressed shell with a spire twice as wide as high at a 95 º angle and radial ridges that create distinct beading pattern and are primarily white with some found to be pale yellowish-brown to yellowish-white. The beautiful sea snail radula is composed of central teeth with 3 cusps on each side, rectangular lateral teeth with small cusps, and smooth marginal teeth. The operculum of Stellaria Chinensis is thin, flexible, and holds a long and narrow opercular lobe. The beautiful sea snail differs from other Xenophoridae with the absence of the tentacular mantle edge and the glandular pad.

== Distribution ==
Found in benthic waters on continental shelves and slopes of depths from 4-140m, the beautiful sea snail is native to the western Pacific more specifically the Indian Ocean, Central Indo-Pacific, and north-eastern Australia. The species is most commonly found in the Philippines, Indonesia, and China. Although it has also occurred in Australia, Chinese Taipei, Japan, Thailand, Fiji, Hong Kong, and Brunei Darussalam. Fossils of Stellaria Chinensis show that they have been existence since the Paleogene period.

== Ecology ==
The sea snail is a deposit feeder and feeds on detritus and other small microorganisms. The species uses its tall and heavily spirally rigid base and unique wide umbilicus to create a “feeding cone” beneath themselves. In a similar fashion to most species in the Xenophoridae family, the beautiful sea snail uses locomotion referred to as a “leaping motion” or “a one-legged stomp” by extending its strombidae (foot) and muscular column which then contracts pulling the shell over. The beautiful sea snail has a small and multi-spiral protoconch which suggests a planktonic larval life which is believed to be rather long to account for the wide geographical range it occupies.

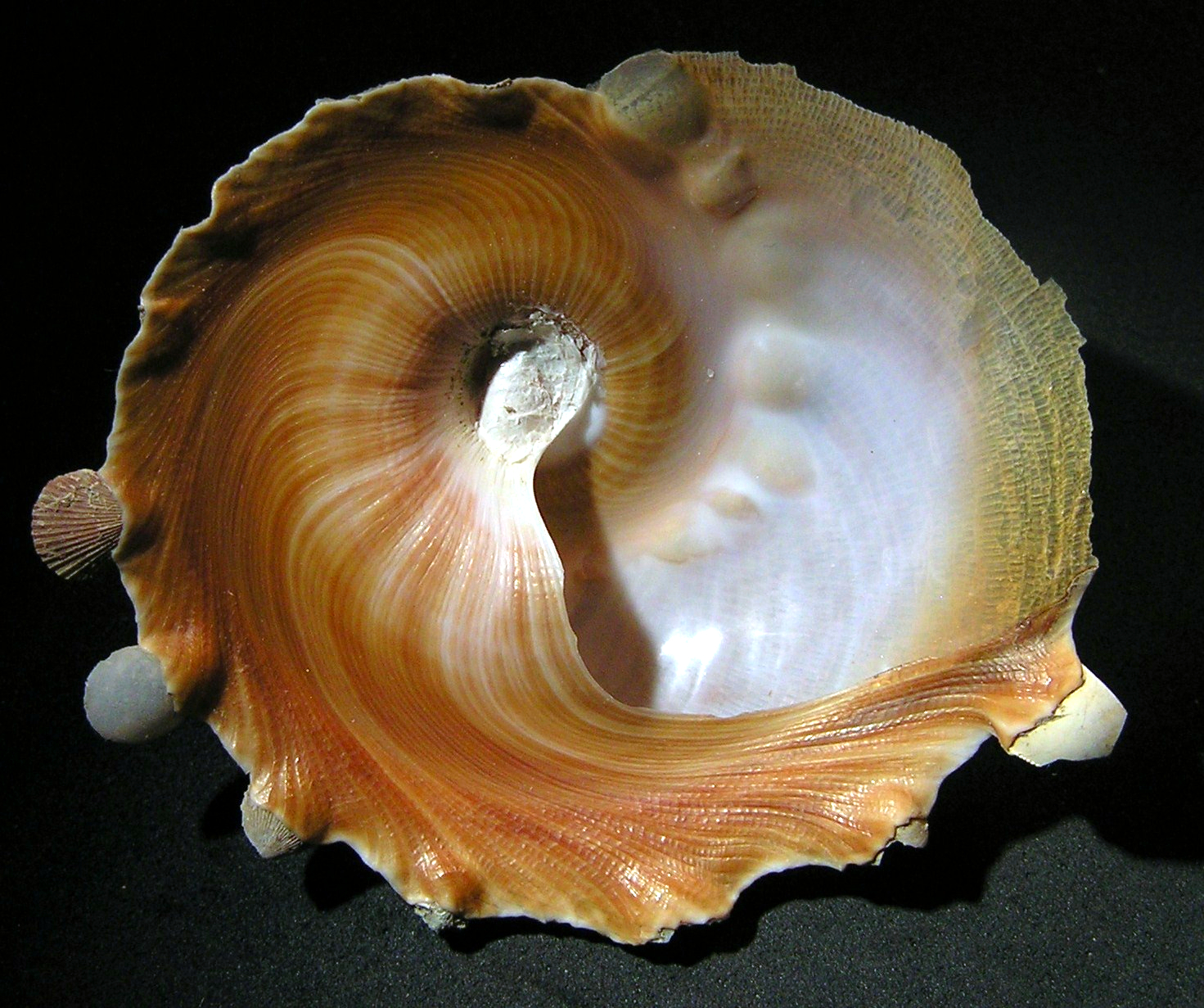
Apertural view of a shell of Stellaria chinensis
