= Onustus caribaeus =

- Onustus caribaeus shells

Scientific classification
- Kingdom: Animalia
- Phylum: Mollusca
- Class: Gastropoda
- Subclass: Caenogastropoda
- Order: Littorinimorpha
- Family: Xenophoridae
- Genus: Onustus
- Species: O. caribaeus

Binomial name
- Onustus caribaeus (Petit de la Saussaye, 1857)

Synonyms
- Xenophora caribaea Petit de la Saussaye, 1857

Species of gastropod

Onustus caribaeus is a species of large sea snail, a marine gastropod mollusk in the family Xenophoridae, the carrier shells.

== Description ==
The anatomy of O. Caribaeus. is very similar to all members of the Xenophoridae family. Their shells have a flat bottom and a short conical spiral on top. They are known for their ability to camouflage by attaching substrates like pebbles, sand, empty shells, and even coral to the top of their shells. The specifics of how this is done are not known. However, we know that these foreign objects are fused to the shells in all different conformations, radially, laterally, or symmetrically as the shell grows. The shells can reach a maximum height of 45 mm, in average 37 mm. The diameter of the base reaches a maximum length of 88 mm, in average 60 mm. The colour of the dorsum is yellowish-white. Like other snails, O. Caribaeus have a radula, used for scraping detritus and other substances off of substrates to feed on, and a muscular foot used for locomotion.

== Distribution ==
Onustus caribaeus is distributed in the North-eastern Gulf of Mexico, the Caribbean Sea and along the Atlantic coast of Brazil between 35m and 640m (mostly deeper than 100m).
