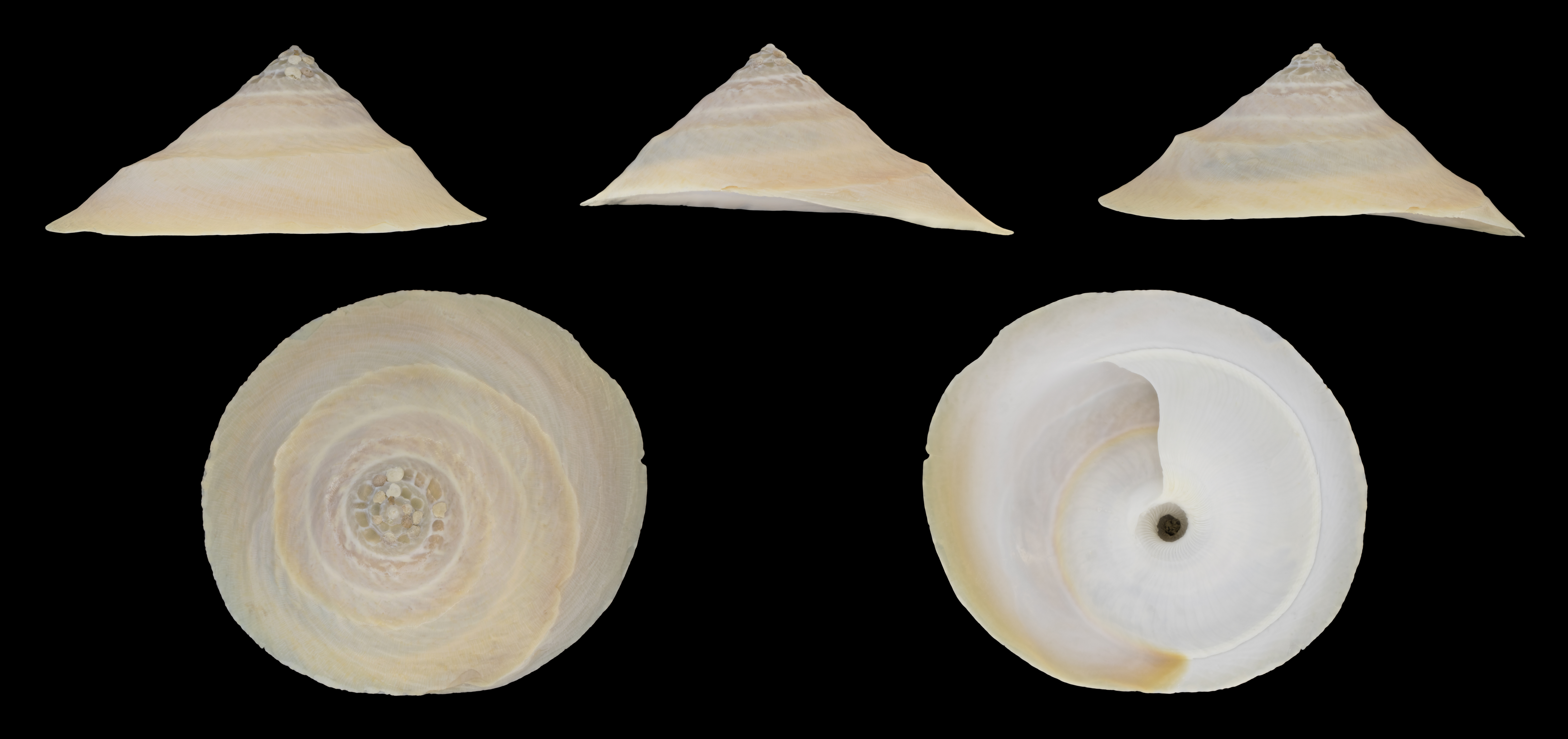

Scientific classification
- Kingdom: Animalia
- Phylum: Mollusca
- Class: Gastropoda
- Subclass: Caenogastropoda
- Order: Littorinimorpha
- Family: Xenophoridae
- Genus: Onustus
- Species: O. indicus

Binomial name
- Onustus indicus (Gmelin, 1791)

Synonyms
- Trochus indicus Gmelin, 1791; Tugurium indicum (Gmelin, 1791); Xenophora wagneri Philippi, 1855; Xenophorus helvaceus Philippi, 1852; Xenophora indica (Gmelin, 1791)

= Onustus indicus =

Species of gastropod

Onustus indicus is a species of large sea snail, a marine gastropod mollusk in the family Xenophoridae, the carrier shells.

== Distribution ==
Onustus indicus is distributed in the tropical Indian Ocean (excluding Arabian Sea), the central Indo-Pacific and the westernmost Pacific (Hong Kong to southern Indonesia) as well as in northern tropical-subtropical eastern and western Australia. It can be found between 4 and 150 m.
