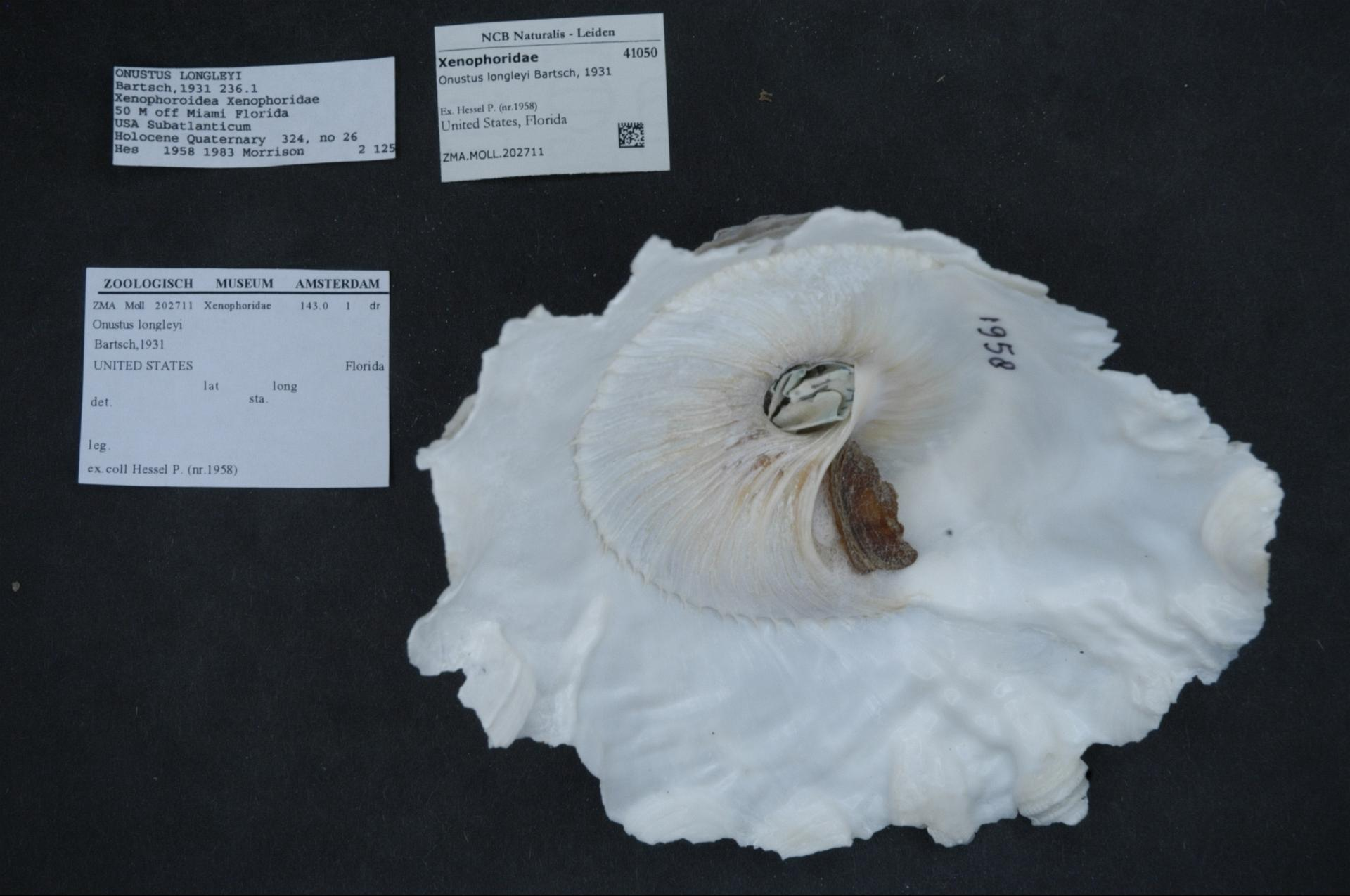

Scientific classification
- Kingdom: Animalia
- Phylum: Mollusca
- Class: Gastropoda
- Subclass: Caenogastropoda
- Order: Littorinimorpha
- Family: Xenophoridae
- Genus: Onustus
- Species: O. longleyi

Binomial name
- Onustus longleyi Bartsch, 1931

Synonyms
- Xenophora longleyi Bartsch, 1931

= Onustus longleyi =

Species of snail

Onustus longleyi is a species of large sea snail, a marine gastropod mollusk in the family Xenophoridae, the carrier shells.

== Description ==
These sea snails are usually a white-cream color, with a cream underside. Their spire is rather smooth, and the lower edge of the shell is quite irregular and jagged. The umbilicus is straight and open to the apex. Small bits of their shells are cemented at the suture. Most of these gastropods have a calcareous external shell. Others lack a shell completely, or have reduced internal shells. These snails are known for their tendency to pick up other shells, skeletal fragments, rocks, or corals (sometimes still alive) from their surrounding environment and cement these objects to their own shells. The result looks like a pile of shells on the seafloor. Often, sponges and serpulid worm tubes are found encrusting the xenophorid shell - as they contribute to the illusion that a xenophorid is simply a patch of the seafloor. Xenophora carrier snails do this as a camouflage defense against predators. A "glue" or mucus is secreted from the outer portion of their body, called the mantle or pallium in Latin, which means cloak or robe. This mucus is a combination of protein, calcium carbonate, etc. that bind together and harden to form the outer shell. It is constantly secreted to enlarge the spiral shell, in a 360-degree manner, as the soft-bodied snail grows. The marine snail "collects" or attaches the bits to the outside edges of the spiral or whorled edges. Their "foot" is the part of their body that they move with.

== Life History Traits ==
This species reproduces sexually. Their embryos develop into planktonic trochophore larvae, and later into juvenile veligers before becoming fully grown adults. These carnivores consume low growing organisms, such as low-growing grasses and algae. The animals move by extending their powerful foot, anchoring the end in the substrate with the operculum (gill cover), and jerking the shell forward in a leaping movement.

== Distribution ==
Onustus longleyi is distributed along the American Atlantic coast from North Carolina to the Gulf of Mexico and the Caribbean reaching Brazil in the South. It can be found between 180 and 695 meters. They are usually found on continental shelves and continental slopes in subtropical and tropical regions. They mostly occupy marine environments, but can also be found in freshwater and terrestrial environments.
