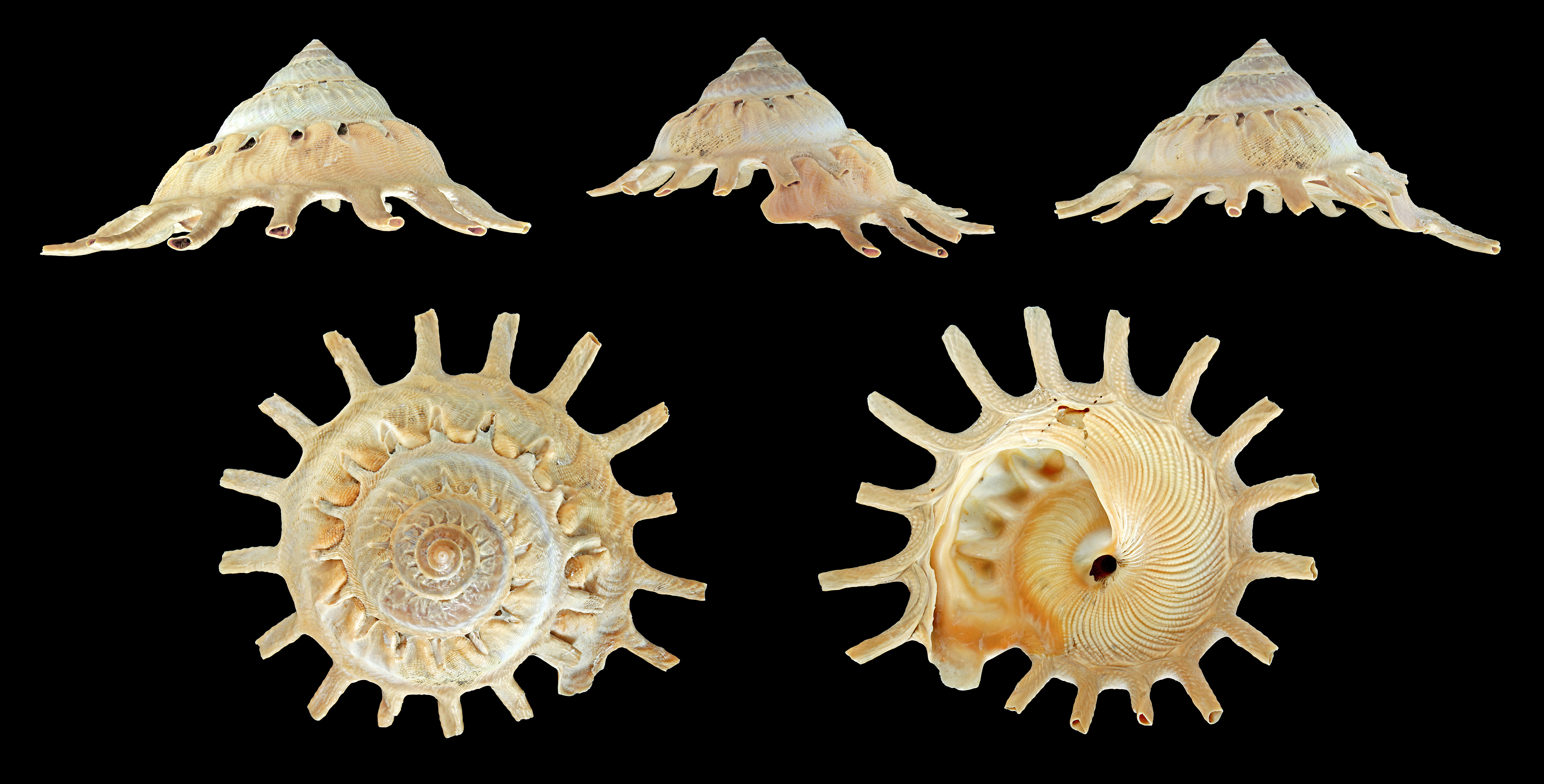
- Five views of a shell of Stellaria solaris

Scientific classification
- Kingdom: Animalia
- Phylum: Mollusca
- Class: Gastropoda
- Subclass: Caenogastropoda
- Order: Littorinimorpha
- Family: Xenophoridae
- Genus: Stellaria; Schmidt in Möller, 1832

Type species
- Trochus solaris Linnaeus, 1764

Synonyms
- Haliphoebus Fischer in Kiener, 1879; Xenophora (Stellaria) Schmidt, 1832

= Stellaria (gastropod) =

Genus of gastropods

Stellaria is a genus of large sea snails, marine gastropod mollusks in the family Xenophoridae, the carrier shells.

== Description ==
Shells medium-sized to large (diameter of base without attachments 65–128 mm; height of shell 48–70 mm), rather depressed to moderately high-spired, widely umbilicate, with wide peripheral flange (30-40% of total diameter at base) which is simple in some species or is digitate or divided into numerous long, hollow, narrow, parallel-sided spines. Ventral side of peripheral flange non-porcellanous. Foreign objects usually small to very small covering less than 30% of dorsal surface.

== Species ==
Species within the genus Stellaria include:

- Stellaria chinensis (Philippi, 1841)
- Stellaria gigantea (Schepman, 1909)
- Stellaria lamberti (Souverbie, 1871)
- Stellaria solaris (Linnaeus, 1764) (type species of Stellaria)
- Stellaria testigera (Bronn, 1831)
  - Stellaria testigera digitata von Martens, 1878
  - Stellaria testigera profunda Ponder, 1983
