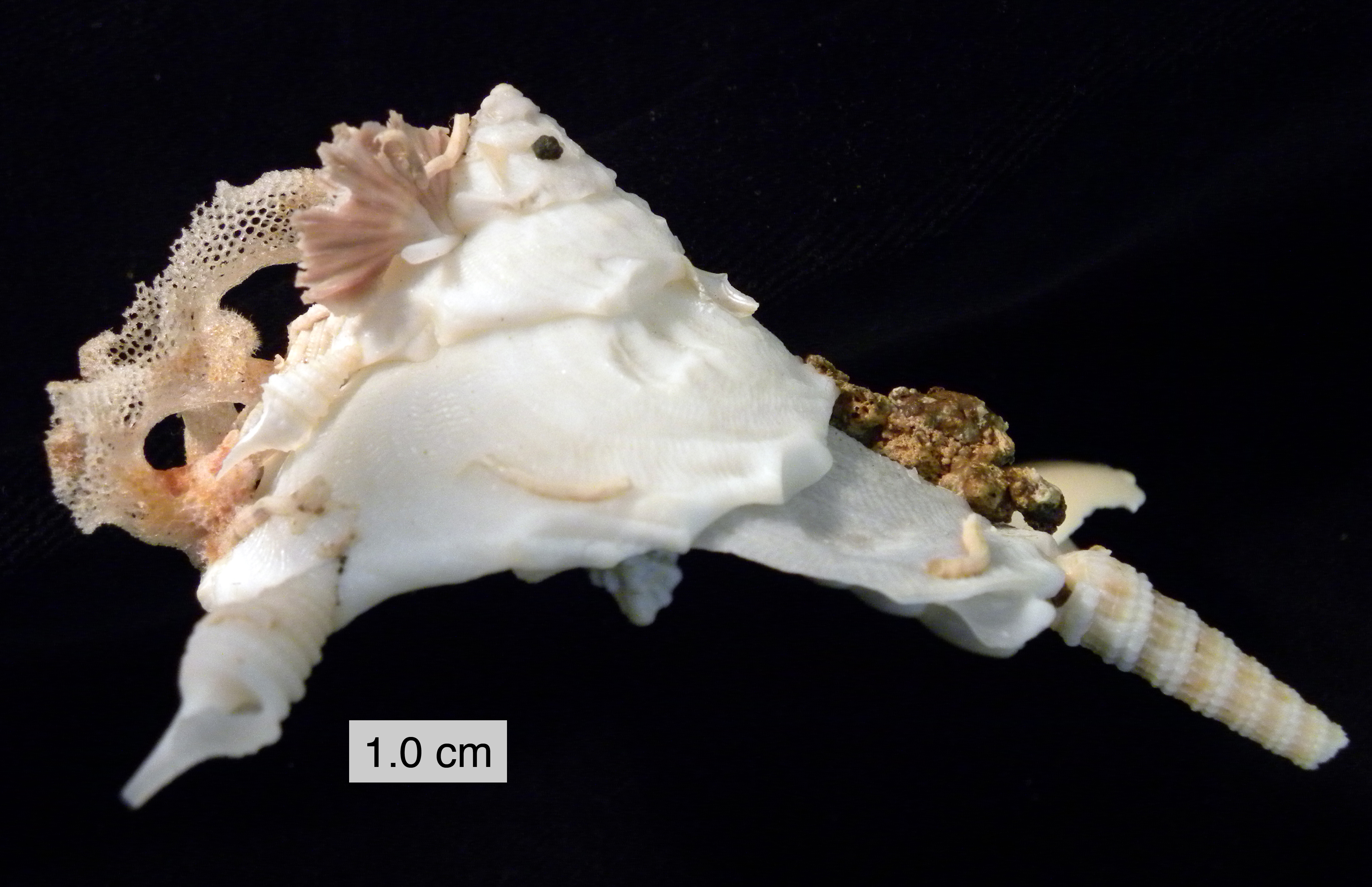
- A lateral view of a carrier shell, family Xenophoridae, with various attachments

Scientific classification
- Kingdom: Animalia
- Phylum: Mollusca
- Class: Gastropoda
- Subclass: Caenogastropoda
- Order: Littorinimorpha
- Superfamily: Xenophoroidea; Troschel, 1852 (1840)

= Xenophoroidea =

Superfamily of gastropods

Xenophoroidea is a superfamily of sea snails, marine gastropod molluscs in the clade Littorinimorpha.

== Taxonomy ==
The following families have been recognized in the taxonomy of Bouchet & Rocroi (2005):

- family Xenophoridae
- family † Lamelliphoridae
