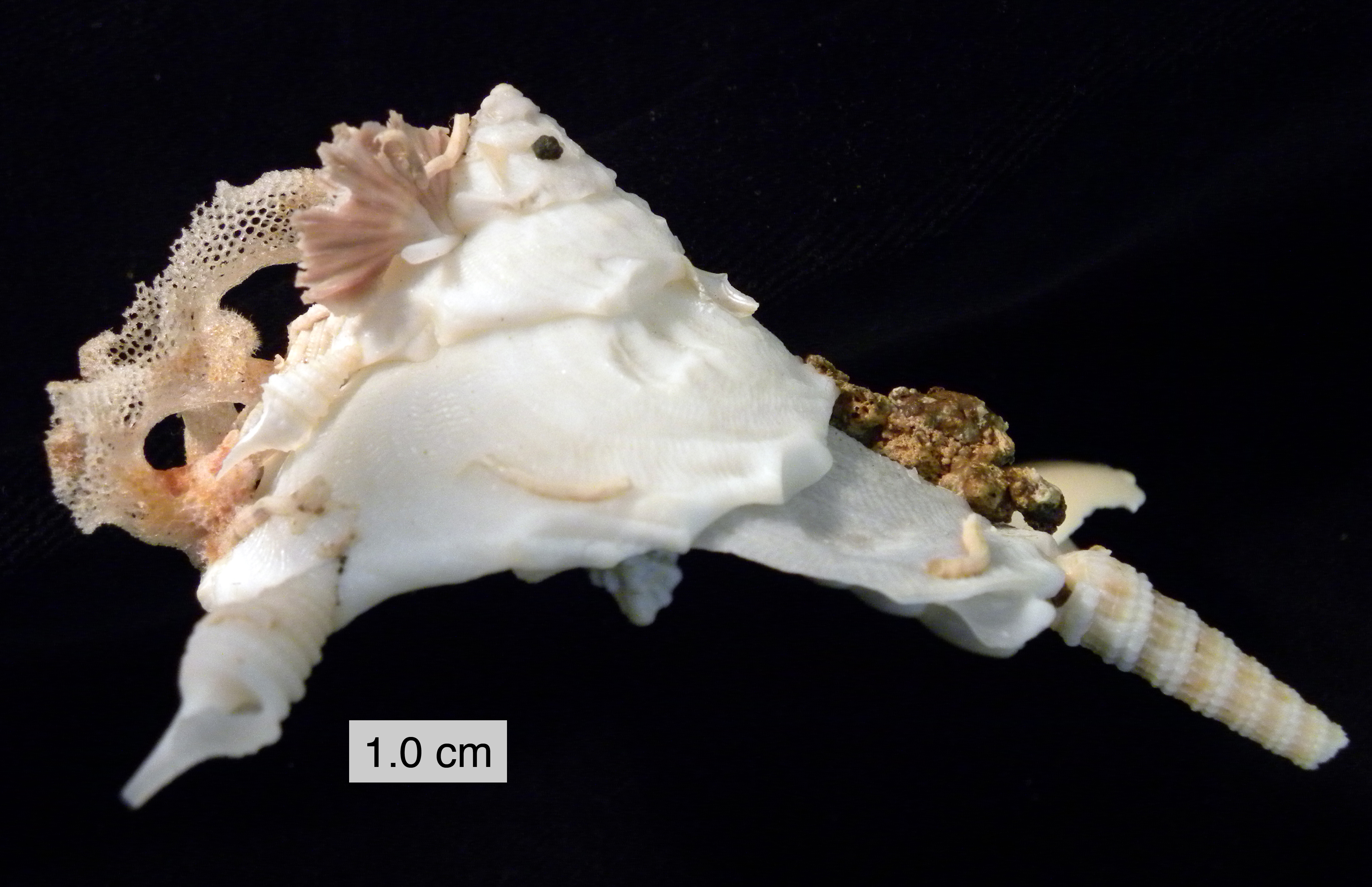
- Xenophora pallidula, a carrier shell

Scientific classification
- Kingdom: Animalia
- Phylum: Mollusca
- Class: Gastropoda
- Subclass: Caenogastropoda
- Order: Littorinimorpha
- Superfamily: Xenophoroidea
- Family: Xenophoridae; Troschel, 1852 (1840)

Genera
- See text

Synonyms
- Phoridae Gray, 1840; Onustidae H. Adams & A. Adams, 1854

= Xenophoridae =

Family of gastropods

Xenophoridae, commonly called carrier shells, is a family of medium-sized to large sea snails, marine gastropod mollusks in the clade Littorinimorpha.

== Distribution ==
The Xenophorids live on sand and mud bottoms of the continental shelves and the continental slopes of the subtropical and tropical seas and range from very shallow water to depths of more than 1,400 meters.

== Shell description ==
Xenophorids are unusual in that in many of the species the animal cements small stones or shells to the edge of the shell as it grows, thus the shells of those species are sometimes humorously referred to as "shell-collecting shells". Additionally, the genus name Xenophora comes from two ancient Greek words and means "bearing (or carrying) foreigners". The shells are small to rather large (diameter of base without attachments 19–160 mm; height of shell 21–100 mm), depressed to conical, with narrow to wide, simple to spinose peripheral edge or flange separating spire from base. Aperture large, base broad, rather flattened, often umbilicate. Periostracum very thin or wanting. Protoconch depressed-conical, multispiral (in one species paucispiral). Teleoconch usually with foreign objects attached in spiral series to peripheral flange and, sometimes, remainder of dorsum, at least on early whorls. Operculum horny, yellowish to brown, nucleus lateral, with simple growth lamellae, sometimes with conspicuous radial striae or hollow radial ribs.

== Classification ==
Xenophoridae belongs to the superfamily Stromboidea, which also includes the true conchs (Strombidae). It had previously been placed in a monotypic superfamily, Xenophoroidea, but placement in Stromboidea is supported by behavioral, anatomical, and genetic data. Within Stromboidea, Xenophoridae appears to be most closely related to Aporrhaidae and Struthiolariidae.

According to the taxonomy of the Gastropoda by Bouchet & Rocroi (2005), the family Xenophoridae has no subfamilies.

=== Genera ===
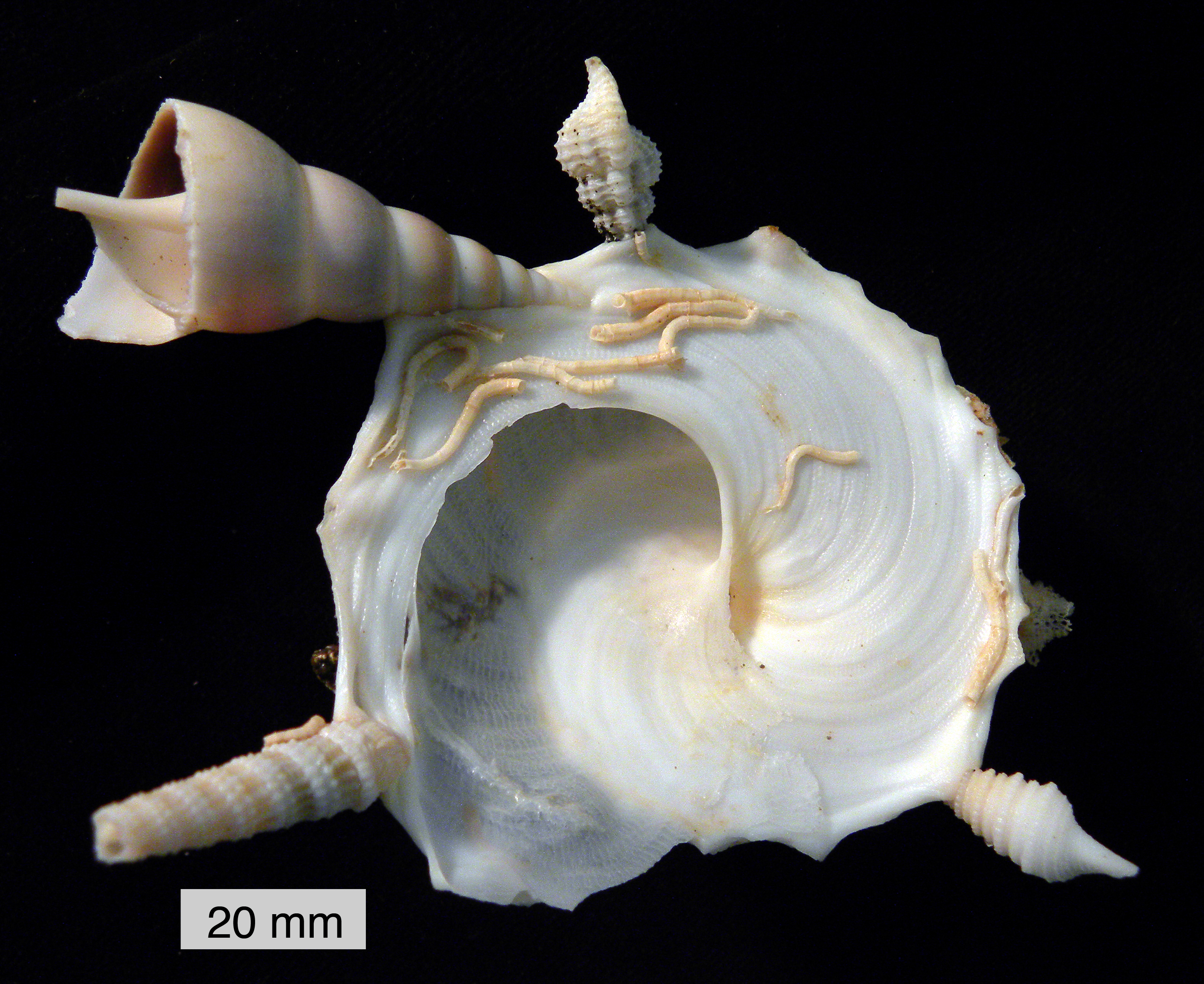
Aperture view of a xenophorid gastropod (Xenophora pallidula).

Genera within the family Xenophoridae include:

- † Acanthoxenophora Perrilliat & Vega, 2001
- Aspidophoreas Nappo, Bini & Santucci, 2022
- Onustus Swainson, 1840 - synonyms: Trochotugurium Sacco, 1896; Tugurium Fischer in Kiener, 1879
- Ponderiana Nappo, Bini & Santucci, 2022
- Stellaria Möller, 1832 - synonym: Haliphoebus Fischer in Kiener, 1879; Xenophora (Stellaria) Schmidt, 1832
- Xenophora Fischer von Waldheim, 1807 - type genus

== Behavior ==
Like other stromboids, xenophorids move in a "leaping" manner. Xenophora conchyliophora has been found to move an average of 233.5 cm per day, with its speed during short-duration "sprints" averaging 1.44 cm per minute and reaching a maximum speed of 5.5 cm per minute.

Xenophorids incorporate shells, coral, and other objects into their shells as they grow. Several different hypotheses have been proposed to explain this behavior.
