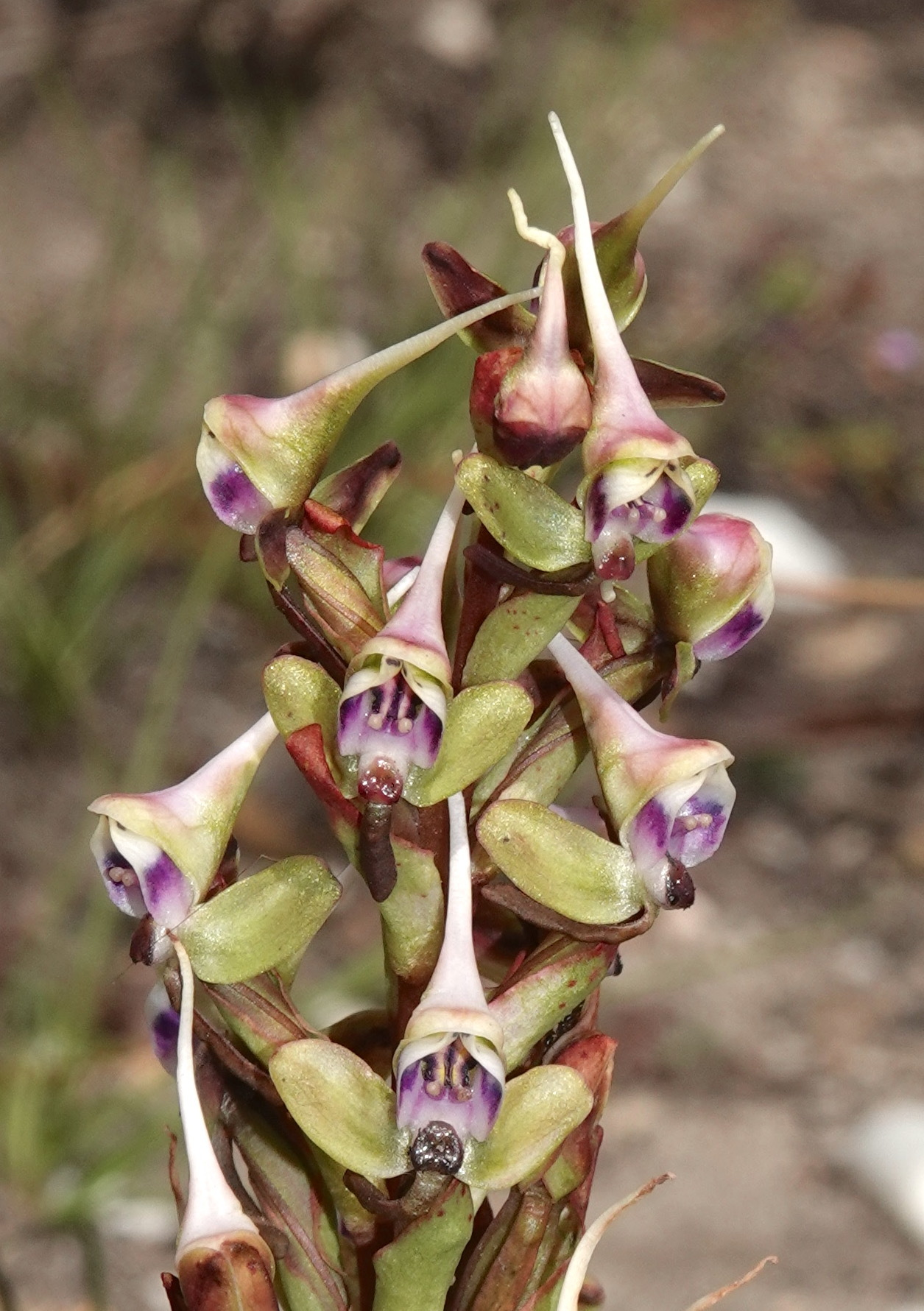

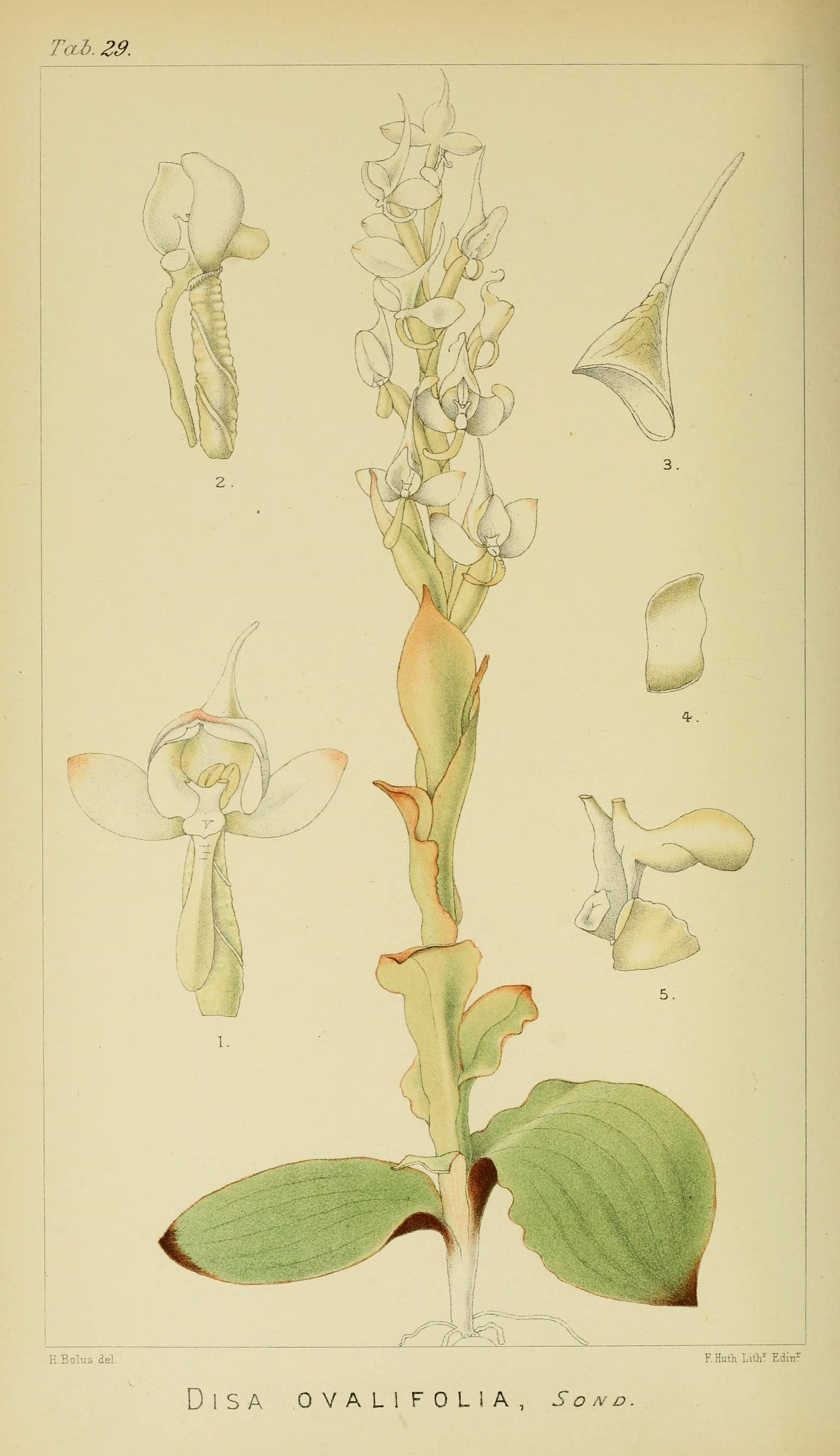

Scientific classification
- Kingdom: Plantae
- Clade: Tracheophytes
- Clade: Angiosperms
- Clade: Monocots
- Order: Asparagales
- Family: Orchidaceae
- Subfamily: Orchidoideae
- Genus: Disa
- Species: D. ovalifolia

Binomial name
- Disa ovalifolia Sond.

= Disa ovalifolia =

Species of flowering plant

Disa ovalifolia is a perennial plant and geophyte belonging to the genus Disa and is part of the fynbos. The plant is endemic to the Western Cape and occurs from Montagu to Clanwilliam and Darling, on deep, sandy soils at altitudes of 400 - 1 300 m. The species has lost 10% of its habitat in the north to the production of rooibos tea cultivation.
