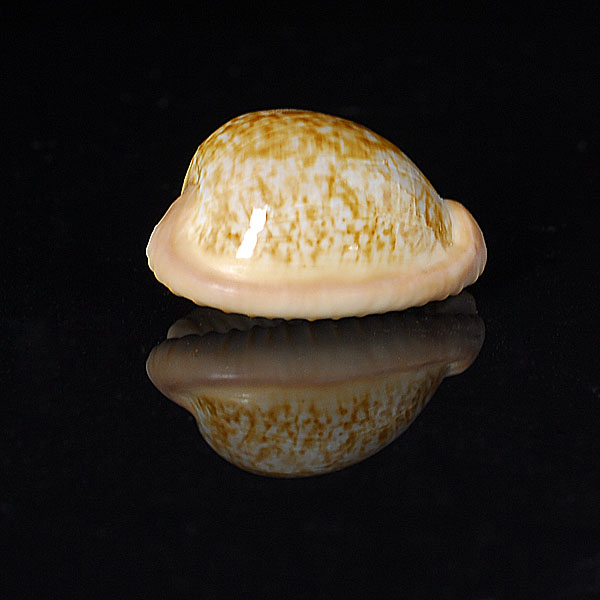
- A lateral view of a shell of Cypraeovula fuscorubra, anterior end towards the right

Scientific classification
- Kingdom: Animalia
- Phylum: Mollusca
- Class: Gastropoda
- Subclass: Caenogastropoda
- Order: Littorinimorpha
- Family: Cypraeidae
- Genus: Cypraeovula
- Species: C. fuscorubra

Binomial name
- Cypraeovula fuscorubra (Shaw, 1909)

Synonyms
- Cypraea fuscorubra Shaw, 1909; Cypraea similis Gray, 1831 (Invalid: junior homonym of Cypraea similis Gmelin, 1791)

= Cypraeovula fuscorubra =

Species of gastropod

Cypraeovula fuscorubra is a species of sea snail, a cowry, a marine gastropod mollusc in the family Cypraeidae, the cowries.

== Subspecies ==
- Cypraeovula fuscorubra fuscorubra (Shaw, 1909)
- Cypraeovula fuscorubra gondwanalandensis (Burgess, 1970)

== Description ==
The mantle is variable in colour from white to black and orange to pink and red, with a finely granular surface. There are small papillae along the mantle edges and there may be black and white markings. The siphon is short and recurved and is usually transparent white with an opaque white rim. Cephalic tentacles are tapered and fairly thick and yellow to orange in colour. The foot is short and fleshy and is usually less strongly pigmented than the mantle and is often marked with small black and white dots or flecks.

The shell is generally pear-shaped, and the colour ranges from beige and mauve to grey with an overlay of densely spaced reddish brown spots, which may be interrupted on the right side by a mantle line. Base and margins are thickened and usually beige or brown, but may be purple when fresh. Labrum is broad with a matte finish and 17 to 18 pigmented denticles. The aperture is fairly narrow but widens towards the front and curves to the rear.

== Distribution ==
This marine species occurs off South Africa from Dassen Island to Cape Agulhas.

== Natural history ==
The cowrie is found on reefs from 15 to over 80 metres depth, often on the sides of large granite boulders and feeds primarily on demosponges, but also algal and bryozoan material.
