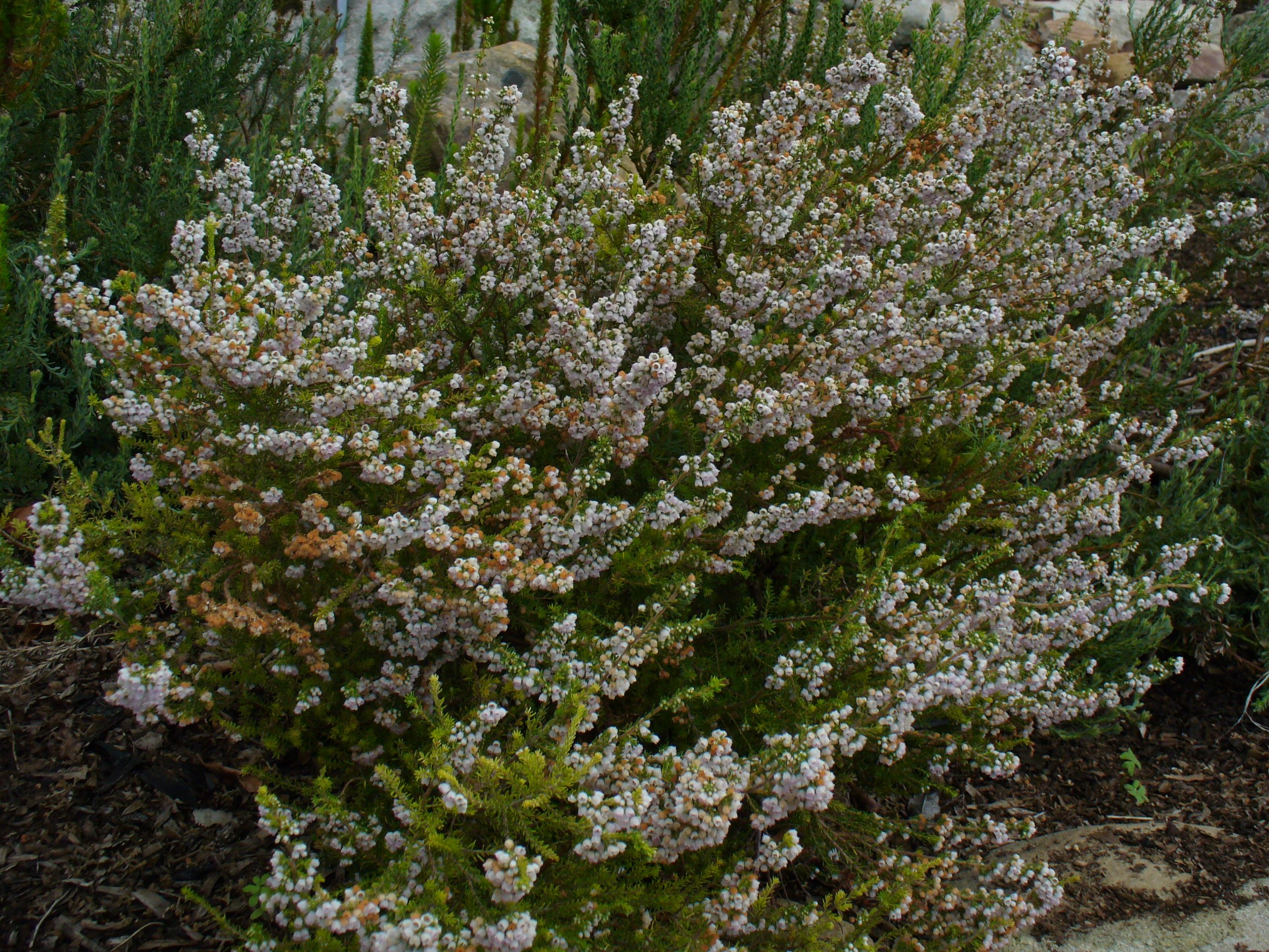

Scientific classification
- Kingdom: Plantae
- Clade: Tracheophytes
- Clade: Angiosperms
- Clade: Eudicots
- Clade: Asterids
- Order: Ericales
- Family: Ericaceae
- Genus: Erica
- Species: E. bolusiae

Binomial name
- Erica bolusiae T.M.Salter (1935)

= Erica bolusiae =

Species of flowering plant

Erica bolusiae is a plant that belongs to the genus Erica and forms part of the fynbos. The plant is endemic to the Western Cape where it occurs from Yzerfontein to Kraaifontein. The plant's habitat is threatened by suburban development, agricultural activities, overgrazing and invasive plants such as the acacia species. There are currently only 250 individuals left.

Two varieties are accepted:

- Erica bolusiae var. bolusiae
- Erica bolusiae var. cyathiformis H.A.Baker
