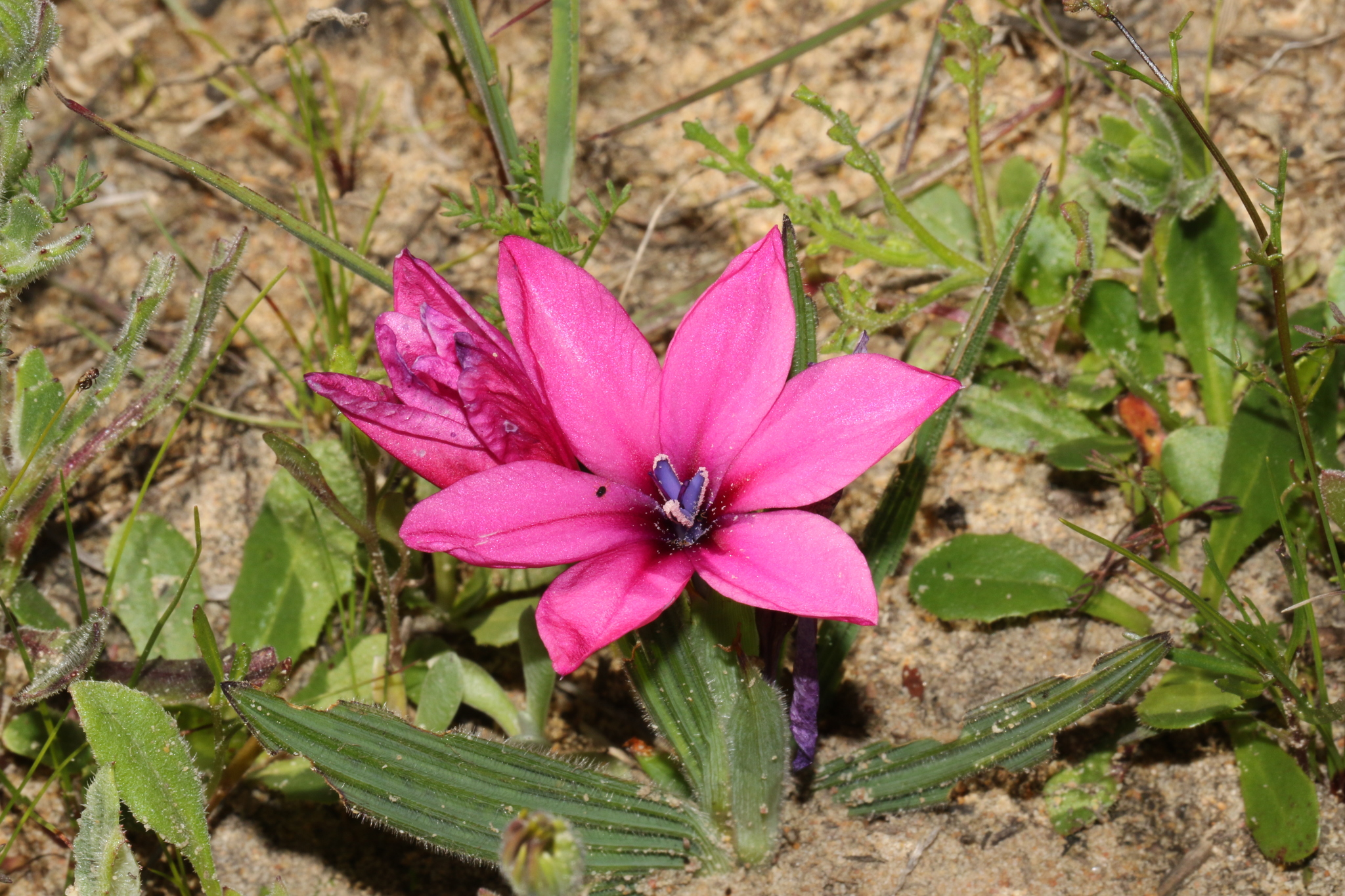

Scientific classification
- Kingdom: Plantae
- Clade: Tracheophytes
- Clade: Angiosperms
- Clade: Monocots
- Order: Asparagales
- Family: Iridaceae
- Genus: Babiana
- Species: B. blanda

Binomial name
- Babiana blanda (L.Bolus) G.J.Lewis, (1959)

Synonyms
- Babiana macrantha var. blanda L.Bolus; Babiana quadripartita Klatt

= Babiana blanda =

Species of flowering plant

Babiana blanda is a perennial flowering plant and geophyte belonging to the genus Babiana and is part of the renosterveld. The species is endemic to the Western Cape. It occurs from Darling to Milnerton and Agter-Paarl. It has a range of less than 63 km² and there are two fragmented subpopulations. The species has already lost 80% of its habitat to urban development and crop cultivation. The species was considered extinct for a while, but in 2006 and 2007 these two subpopulations were found. Invasive plants are also a threat.
