= Darling Wind Farm =

Wind farm in South Africa

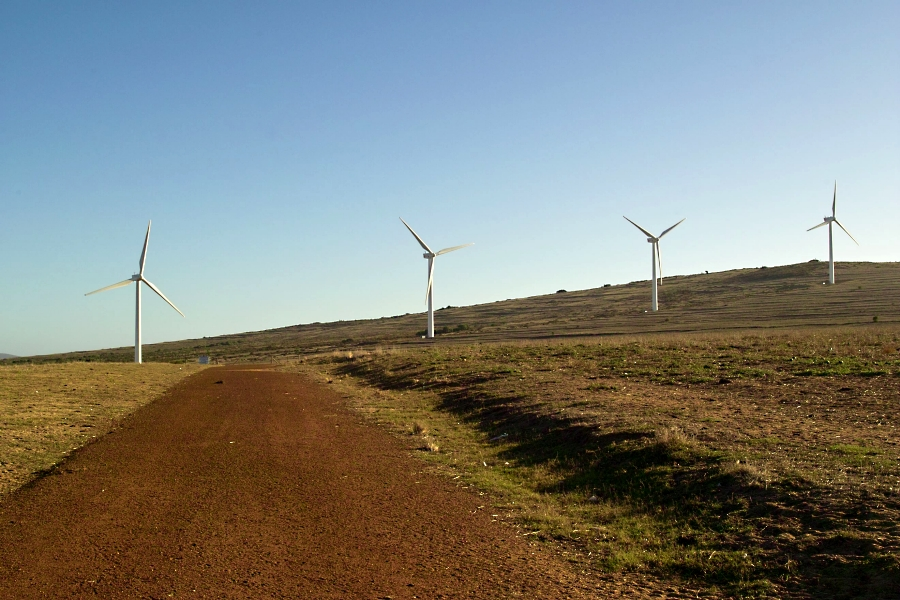
- Darling Wind Farm, Western Cape, South Africa
- Country: South Africa
- Location: 13 km north west of Darling, Western Cape
- Coordinates: 33°19′1″S 18°15′34″E
- Status: Operational
- Commission date: 1 May 2008
- Owner: ENERTRAG South Africa

Wind farm
- Type: Onshore

Power generation
- Units operational: 4 turbines
- Nameplate capacity: 5.2 MW

External links
- Commons: Related media on Commons

Darling Wind Farm was one of the first three wind farms in South Africa. It is located 70 km (43 mi) north of Cape Town, between Darling and Yzerfontein on the west coast of South Africa. Darling Wind Power was incorporated in 2004 as the special purpose vehicle to develop, construct, finance, own and operate the Darling Wind Farm, which was at the time declared a national demonstration project.

On 16 October 2018, ENERTRAG South Africa acquired 100% of the shares of Darling Wind Power (Pty) Ltd from Clean Energy Africa Investments (Pty) Ltd.

== Design ==
The plant consists of four Fuhrländer FL1250 horizontal axis wind turbines, with a total installed capacity of 5.2 MW and reached commercial operation on 1 May 2008. It was financed primarily by funding from The Development Bank of Southern Africa.

== Operation ==
The Darling Wind Farm is selling its green electricity under two Power Purchase Agreements, one with the City of Cape Town, and one with POWERX . Under these two agreements, the four wind turbines feed 8 million kWh of green electricity into the grid.

== See also ==
- List of power stations in South Africa
