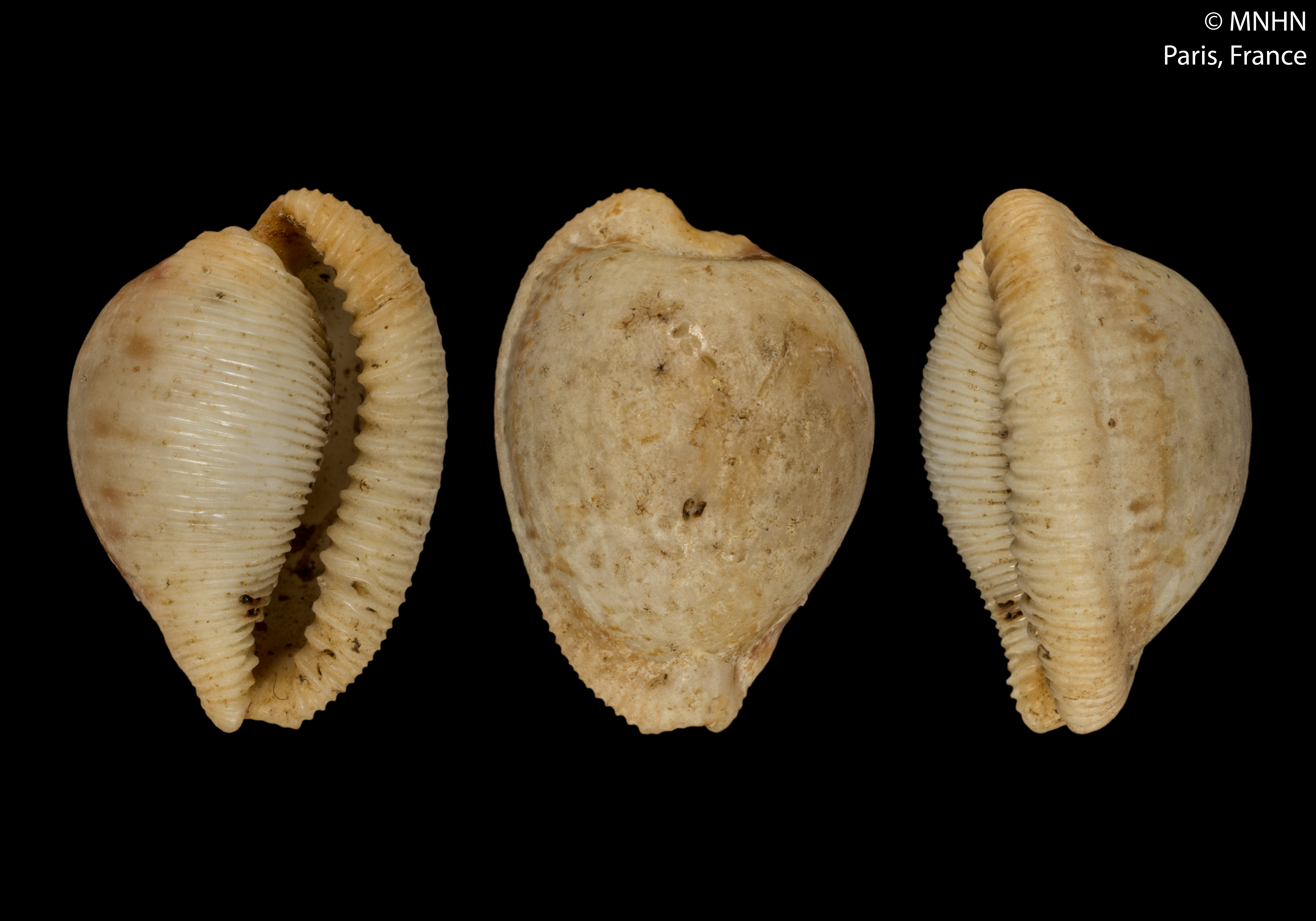
- Shell of Cypraeovula kesslerorum (holotype at MNHN, Paris)

Scientific classification
- Kingdom: Animalia
- Phylum: Mollusca
- Class: Gastropoda
- Subclass: Caenogastropoda
- Order: Littorinimorpha
- Family: Cypraeidae
- Genus: Cypraeovula
- Species: C. kesslerorum

Binomial name
- Cypraeovula kesslerorum Lorenz, 2006

= Cypraeovula kesslerorum =

Species of gastropod

Cypraeovula kesslerorum is a species of sea snail, a cowry, a marine gastropod mollusc in the family Cypraeidae, the cowries.

== Description ==
The length of the shell attains 25.2 mm.

== Distribution ==
This marine species occurs off the eastern coast of South Africa, between Port Alfred and western Transkei, around East London.
