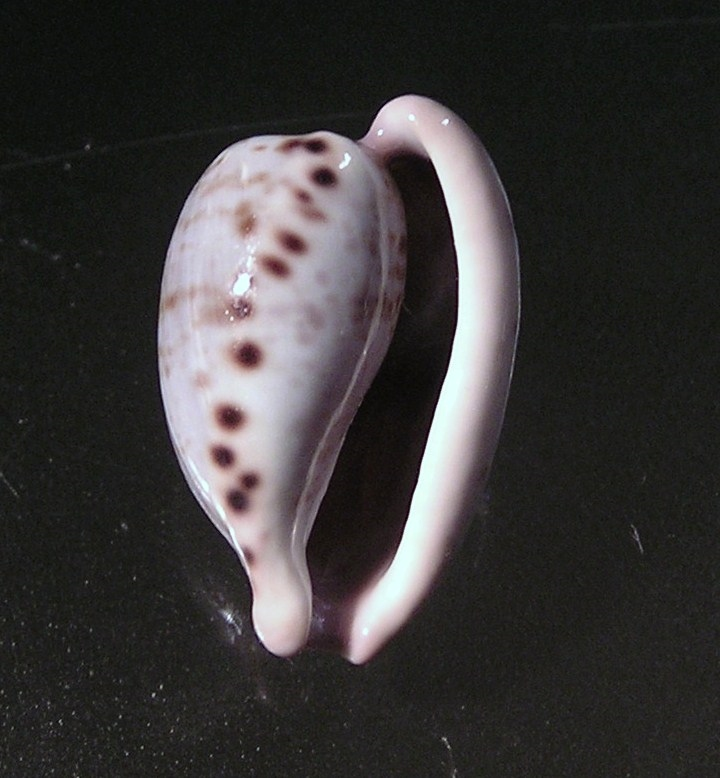
- An apertural view of a shell of Cypraeovula alfredensis, anterior end towards the bottom
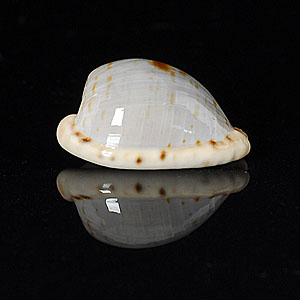
- A lateral view of another shell of Cypraeovula alfredensis, anterior end towards the right

Scientific classification
- Kingdom: Animalia
- Phylum: Mollusca
- Class: Gastropoda
- Subclass: Caenogastropoda
- Order: Littorinimorpha
- Family: Cypraeidae
- Genus: Cypraeovula
- Species: C. alfredensis

Binomial name
- Cypraeovula alfredensis Schilder & Schilder, 1929

Synonyms
- Cypraea alfredensis (Schilder & Schilder, 1929)

= Cypraeovula alfredensis =

Species of gastropod

Cypraeovula alfredensis is a species of sea snail, a cowry, a marine gastropod mollusc in the family Cypraeidae, the cowries.

== Subspecies ==
- Cypraeovula alfredensis alfredensis (Schilder & Schilder, 1929)
- Cypraeovula alfredensis transkeiana Lorenz, 2002
