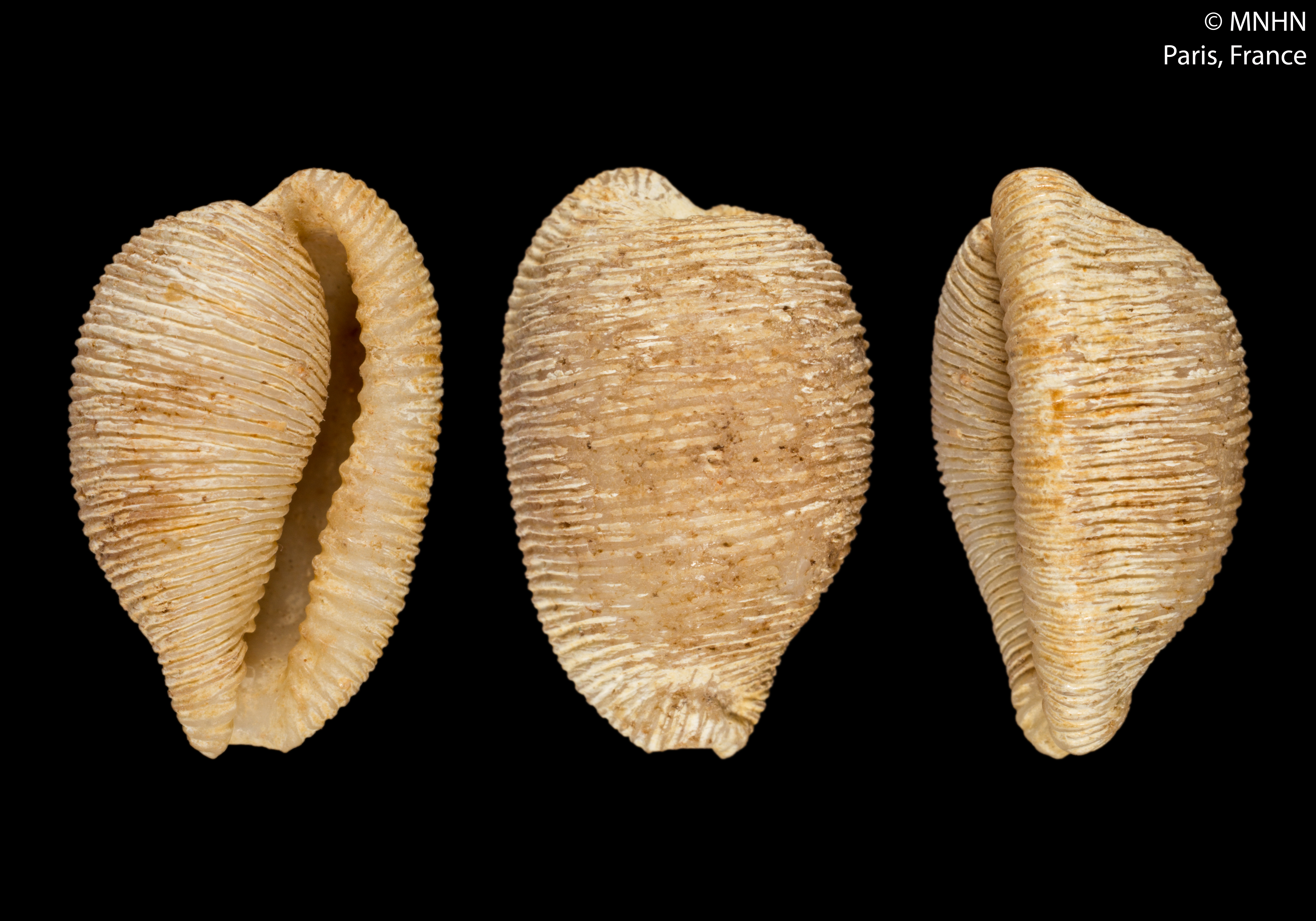
- Shell of Cypraeovula capensis archilyra (holotype at MNHN, Paris)

Scientific classification
- Kingdom: Animalia
- Phylum: Mollusca
- Class: Gastropoda
- Subclass: Caenogastropoda
- Order: Littorinimorpha
- Family: Cypraeidae
- Genus: Cypraeovula
- Species: C. capensis

Binomial name
- Cypraeovula capensis (Gray, 1828)

Synonyms
- Cypraea (Cypraeovula) capensis Gray, 1828; Cypraea capensis (Gray, 1828) (basionym); Cypraea capensis f. elizabethensis Rous, 1905; Cypraea capensis var. albolineata W. H. Turton, 1932 (junior synonym)

= Cypraeovula capensis =

Species of gastropod

Cypraeovula capensis, common name the Cape cowrie, is a species of sea snail, a cowry, a marine gastropod mollusc in the family Cypraeidae, the cowries.

== Subspecies ==
The following subspecies are accepted :

- Cypraeovula capensis archilyra Van Heesvelde & Deprez, 2006
- Cypraeovula capensis capensis (Gray, 1828)
- Cypraeovula capensis cineracea Aiken, 2016
- Cypraeovula capensis gonubiensis Massier, 1993
- Cypraeovula capensis gorda Van Heesvelde & Deprez, 2006
- Cypraeovula capensis profundorum Seccombe, 2003

== Distribution ==
This marine species occurs off the East Coast of South Africa.
