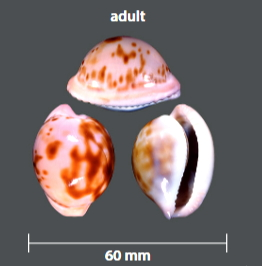
- Shell of Cypraeovula iutsui

Scientific classification
- Kingdom: Animalia
- Phylum: Mollusca
- Class: Gastropoda
- Subclass: Caenogastropoda
- Order: Littorinimorpha
- Family: Cypraeidae
- Genus: Cypraeovula
- Species: C. iutsui

Binomial name
- Cypraeovula iutsui (Shikama, 1974)

Synonyms
- Crossia iutsui (Shikama, 1974) superseded combination; Cypraea iutsui (Shikama, 1974); Cypraeovula (Crossia) iutsui Shikama, 1974 superseded combination; Cypraeovula iutsui iutsui Shikama, 1974 superseded combination

= Cypraeovula iutsui =

Species of gastropod

Cypraeovula iutsui is a species of sea snail, a marine gastropod mollusc in the family Cypraeidae, the cowries.

== Distribution ==
This species occurs from the mouth of the Olifants River in the Western Cape, to Port Alfred, Eastern Cape, South Africa.

== Description ==
The length of an adult shell varies between 22 mm and 41 mm.

Thin transparent beige mantle has beige or black conical papillae. The siphon is the same colour as mantle. The cephalic tentacles are slender, elongate and off-white. The short translucent white foot is wide at the front and rounded at the rear. T

The shell is globular, often nearly spherical, up to 41mm in length. Atlantic specimens vary in colour from pale plum to opaque white, with little dorsal marking. Indian Ocean specimens are more colourful, and may have red to rut- brown dorsal markings. The labrum is broad with a dull surface, and has 17 to 25 fine denticles on the inner edge, which usually extend as fine ridges for a few millimetres. The columella is deeply convoluted and poorly developed. The shell aperture is narrow and of even width along its length.

The shell is globular, often nearly spherical, with the spire completely enveloped by the final adult whorl. The aperture is elongated, featuring a thickened, white, denticulate margin. The outer lip (labrum) is equipped with 17–25 prominent teeth. Juvenile specimens, known as the 'bulla' stage, are common and retain vestiges of the spire as well as a narrowed siphonal region.

Specimens from the west coast range in color from opaque white to pale plum, with few dorsal markings. In contrast, specimens from the Agulhas Bank are more densely patterned, featuring reddish-brown spots and blotches across the dorsum.

== Habitat ==
This species is endemic to South Africa. Specimens have been collected from 150 to 250m depth on the Agulhas Bank, and from below 50m on the Atlantic coast.

== Conservation status ==
No data is available on the conservation status of this species.
