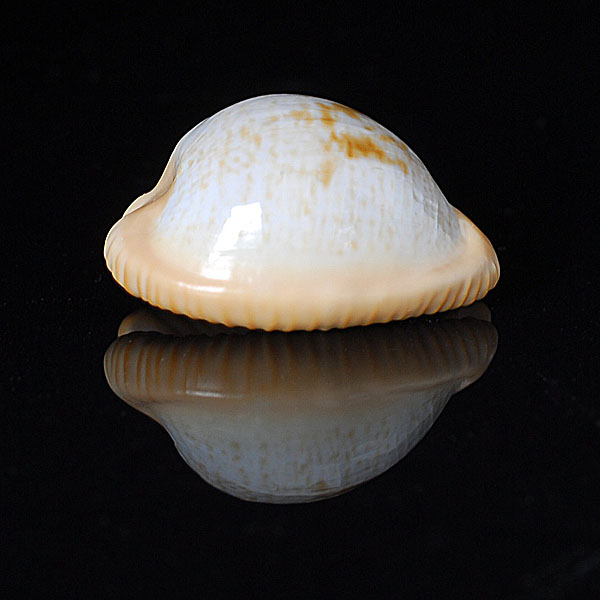

Scientific classification
- Domain: Eukaryota
- Kingdom: Animalia
- Phylum: Mollusca
- Class: Gastropoda
- Subclass: Caenogastropoda
- Order: Littorinimorpha
- Family: Cypraeidae
- Genus: Cypraeovula
- Species: C. fuscodentata

Binomial name
- Cypraeovula fuscodentata (Gray, 1825)

Synonyms
- Cypraea fuscodentata Gray, 1825; Cypraeovula fuscodentata fuscodentata (Gray, 1825)· accepted, alternate representation

= Cypraeovula fuscodentata =

Species of gastropod

Cypraeovula fuscodentata (dark-toothed cowrie, also spelled 'cowry') is a species of medium-sized sea snail, a predatory marine gastropod mollusc in the family Cypraeidae, the cowries.

== Subspecies ==
Two subspecies have been recognized :

- Cypraeovula fuscodentata grohorum Lorenz, 2002
- Cypraeovula fuscodentata sphaerica Lorenz, 2002

== Distribution ==
Cypraeovula fuscodentata is known off the southern African coast from the Cape Peninsula to Port Alfred, subtidally to at least 25m. The species is endemic to this region.

== Description ==
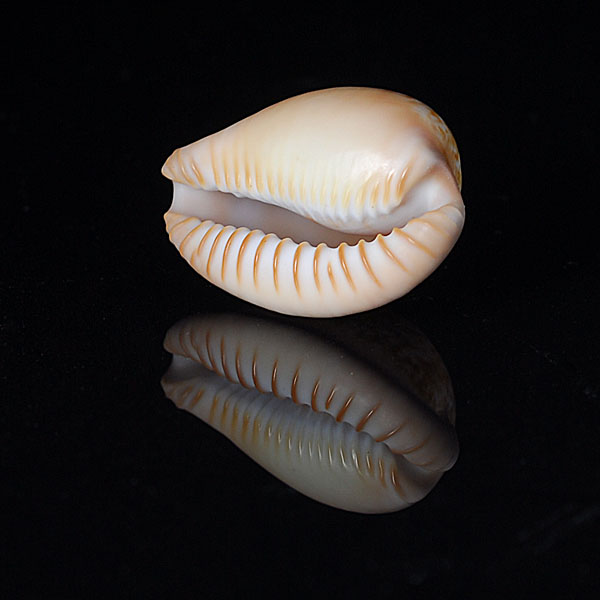
Cypraeovula dentata, apertural view

The dark-toothed cowrie has a medium-sized shell which may grow to 60mm in total length. The shell is generally smooth and caramel-coloured, flecked with pale blue or mauve, but in live specimens is usually covered with the mantle. Variations in shell colour range from pale blue or mauve to dark chocolate brown. The dorsum may be covered by dense transverse rows of yellowish dashes, and may be transversely faceted. The shell shape may vary between relatively elongated, to quite globular or pear-shaped.

The shell's undersides, which are not visible in living animals, are strongly ribbed. The ribs are toffee-coloured. The labrum is broad and robust, with 15 to 19 pigmented denticles. The aperture is narrow and may be constricted towards the rear.

The mantle coloration is highly variable but is usually tawny and spotted with black. Color variations run from black to milky white and light to dark orange to pink and brownish red. The mantle may also have randomly scattered white spots and simple papillae and has a fine granular texture. The siphon is short and slightly recurved, usually the same colour as the mantle, but with a white band round the tip. The cephalic tentacles are slender and taper towards the tips. They are yellow to light orange in colour. The foot is fleshy and muscular and usually similar in colour to the mantle

== Ecology ==
This animal is never common, but where found, is usually associated with black sponges.
