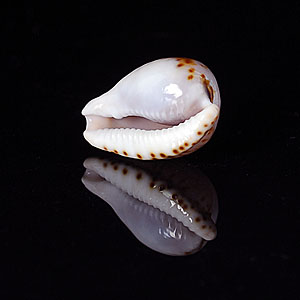

Scientific classification
- Kingdom: Animalia
- Phylum: Mollusca
- Class: Gastropoda
- Subclass: Caenogastropoda
- Order: Littorinimorpha
- Family: Cypraeidae
- Genus: Cypraeovula
- Species: C. mikeharti

Binomial name
- Cypraeovula mikeharti Lorenz, 1985

= Cypraeovula mikeharti =

Species of gastropod

Cypraeovula mikeharti is a species of sea snail, a cowry, a marine gastropod mollusc in the family Cypraeidae, the cowries.
