= Cypraeovula cruickshanki =

Scientific classification
- Kingdom: Animalia
- Phylum: Mollusca
- Class: Gastropoda
- Subclass: Caenogastropoda
- Order: Littorinimorpha
- Family: Cypraeidae
- Genus: Cypraeovula
- Species: C. cruickshanki

Binomial name
- Cypraeovula cruickshanki (Kilburn, 1972)

Synonyms
- Cypraea cruickshanki Kilburn, 1972

Species of gastropod

Cypraeovula cruickshanki is a species of sea snail, a cowry, a marine gastropod mollusc in the family Cypraeidae, the cowries.

== Description ==
This globular species attains a size of 30 mm.

== Distribution ==
Durban, at 430 m. depth.
