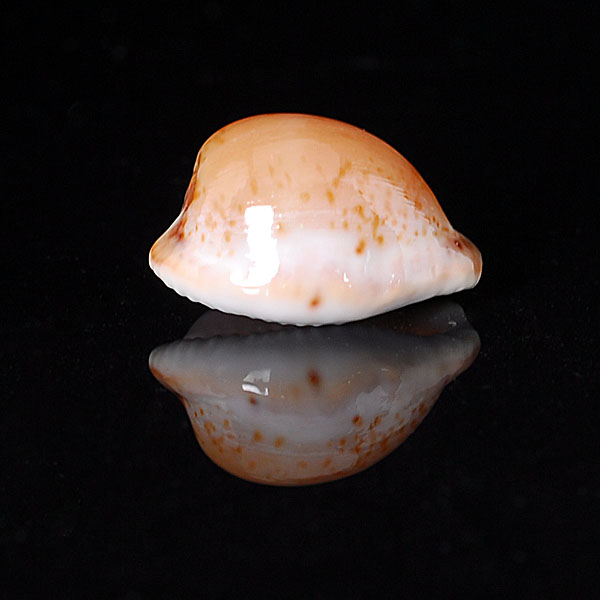
- A lateral view of a shell of Cypraeovula edentula, anterior end towards the right

Scientific classification
- Kingdom: Animalia
- Phylum: Mollusca
- Class: Gastropoda
- Subclass: Caenogastropoda
- Order: Littorinimorpha
- Family: Cypraeidae
- Genus: Cypraeovula
- Species: C. edentula

Binomial name
- Cypraeovula edentula Gray, 1825

Synonyms
- Cypraea edentula Gray, 1825; Luponia edentula (Gray, 1825)

= Cypraeovula edentula =

Species of sea snail

Cypraeovula edentulata, common name : the toothless cowrie, is a species of sea snail, a cowry, a marine gastropod mollusc in the family Cypraeidae, the cowries.

== Distribution ==
This marine species is distributed along Tanzania and the East Coast of South Africa.
