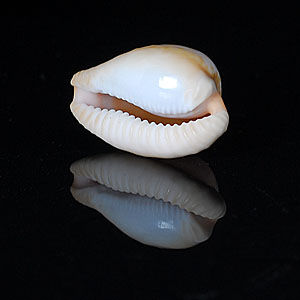

Scientific classification
- Kingdom: Animalia
- Phylum: Mollusca
- Class: Gastropoda
- Subclass: Caenogastropoda
- Order: Littorinimorpha
- Family: Cypraeidae
- Genus: Cypraeovula
- Species: C. coronata

Binomial name
- Cypraeovula coronata (Schilder, 1930)

Synonyms
- Cypraea coronata Schilder, 1930

= Cypraeovula coronata =

Species of gastropod

Cypraeovula coronata is a species of sea snail, a cowry, a marine gastropod mollusc in the family Cypraeidae, the cowries.

== Subspecies ==
- Cypraeovula coronata debruini Lorenz, 2002
- Cypraeovula coronata gabriellii Lorenz, 1993
- Cypraeovula coronata gloriosa Shikama, 1971
- Cypraeovula coronata immaculata Raybaudi, 1986
- Cypraeovula coronata infantensis Aiken, 2016
