= Cypraeovula amphithales =

Scientific classification
- Kingdom: Animalia
- Phylum: Mollusca
- Class: Gastropoda
- Subclass: Caenogastropoda
- Order: Littorinimorpha
- Family: Cypraeidae
- Genus: Cypraeovula
- Species: C. amphithales

Binomial name
- Cypraeovula amphithales (Melvill, 1888)

Species of gastropod

Cypraeovula amphithales is a species of sea snail, a cowry, a marine gastropod mollusc in the family Cypraeidae, the cowries.
