= !Khwa ttu =

San heritage centre in the Western Cape, South Africa

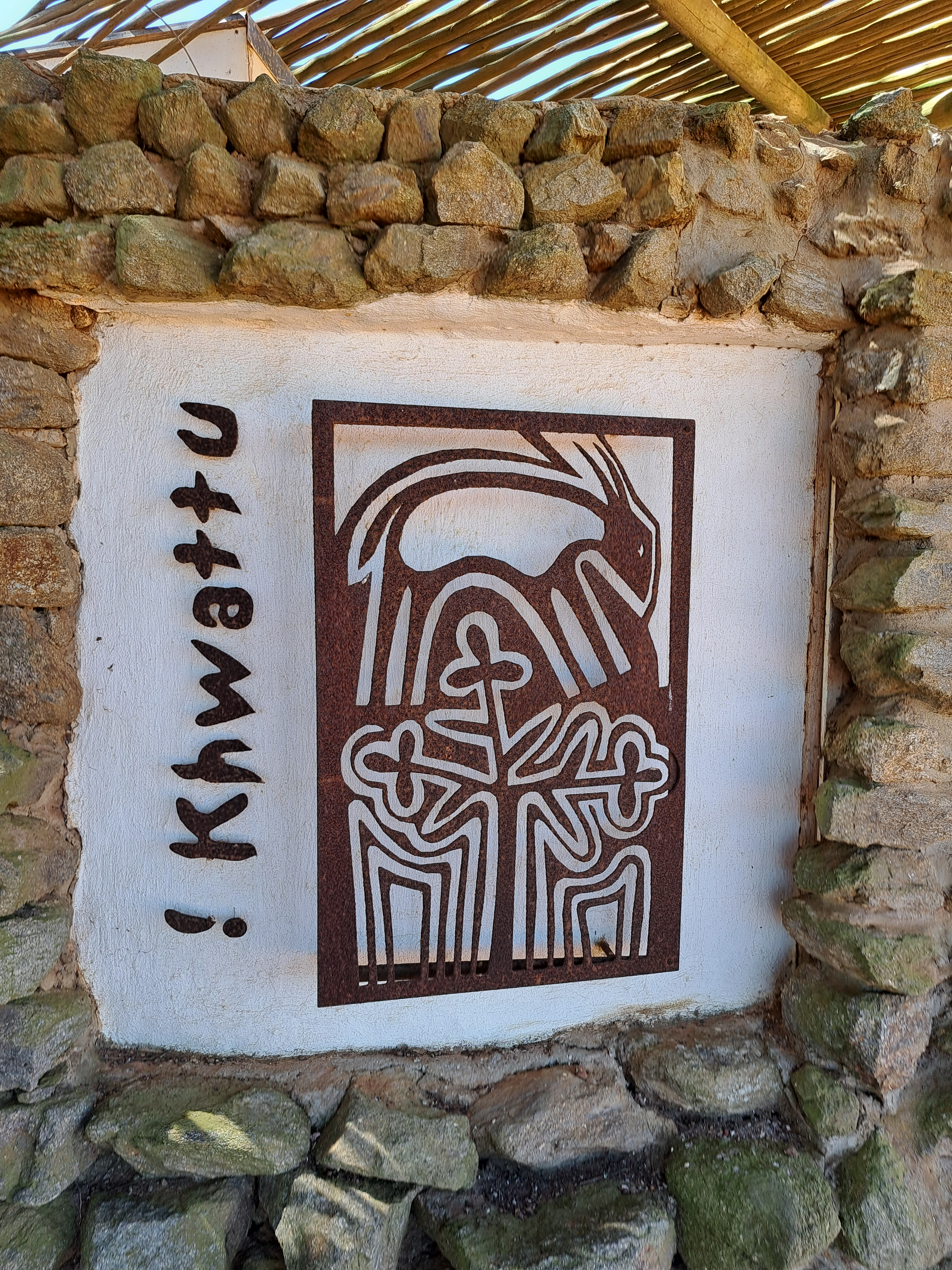
- Established: 1999
- Location: R27 West Coast Road, Yzerfontein/Darling, Western Cape, South Africa
- Coordinates: 33°21′44.55″S 18°16′14.12″E
- Collections: San culture, history, and heritage
- Owner: !Khwa ttu San Heritage Centre
- Website: Official website

!Khwa ttu is a cultural and education centre that interprets the customs, culture, history, and contemporary life of the San peoples of Southern Africa. It is located 13 kilometres inland east of the Yzerfontein coast, about 70 kilometres north of Cape Town in Western Cape, South Africa, consisting of an 850-hectare nature reserve developed on a former wheat farm.

The center was founded in 1999, originating from work by the Working Group of Indigenous Minorities in Southern Africa and the South African San Institute, with support from Swiss anthropologist Irène Staehelin and the Ubuntu Foundation. !Khwa ttu opened to the public in 2006, and contains a cultural centre and museum, hiking trails, a restaurant, and accommodation staffed by 33 San employees. The centre also provides training and employment opportunities, with its ||Kabbo Academy offering training programmes for young San men and women from across the region.

== Collection ==
The museum presents San history, language, knowledge systems, art and identity, of both traditional heritage and contemporary life. Its permanent exhibition is arranged across three main themes: San origins and early art; encounters with colonisation and contemporary San community life; and San knowledge, skills and lifeways in the Kalahari. The exhibition displays include material on human origins, archaeology, genetics, San land loss, healing practices, oral history, identity, and San knowledge systems.

The collection includes a digital archive intended to connect San communities with historical records, images, and community knowledge. In 2023, !Khwa ttu opened Bringing Back the Archive, an exhibition developed through a collaboration with the Harvard Peabody Museum. The exhibition featured selections from the Marshall family collection of photographs and films of Jul'hoansi communities (Also known as !Kung).

The centre has also presented material from the ǂKhomani Brody San Archive, a community archive held at University of Cape Town Libraries Special Collections that includes materials relating to the ǂKhomani San.

== Conservation ==
!Khwa ttu is also involved in biodiversity conservation and land restoration of its campus, an original farm site. The center features a garden of indigenous plant species that the San traditionally forage from. In 2024 the center received a grant from the International Climate Initiative, funded by the German government, that went towards biodiversity conservation and ecological restoration in service of creating a buffer zone of the nearby West Coast National Park.

== See also ==
- San people
- West Coast National Park
- Cultural tourism
- Indigenous peoples of Africa
