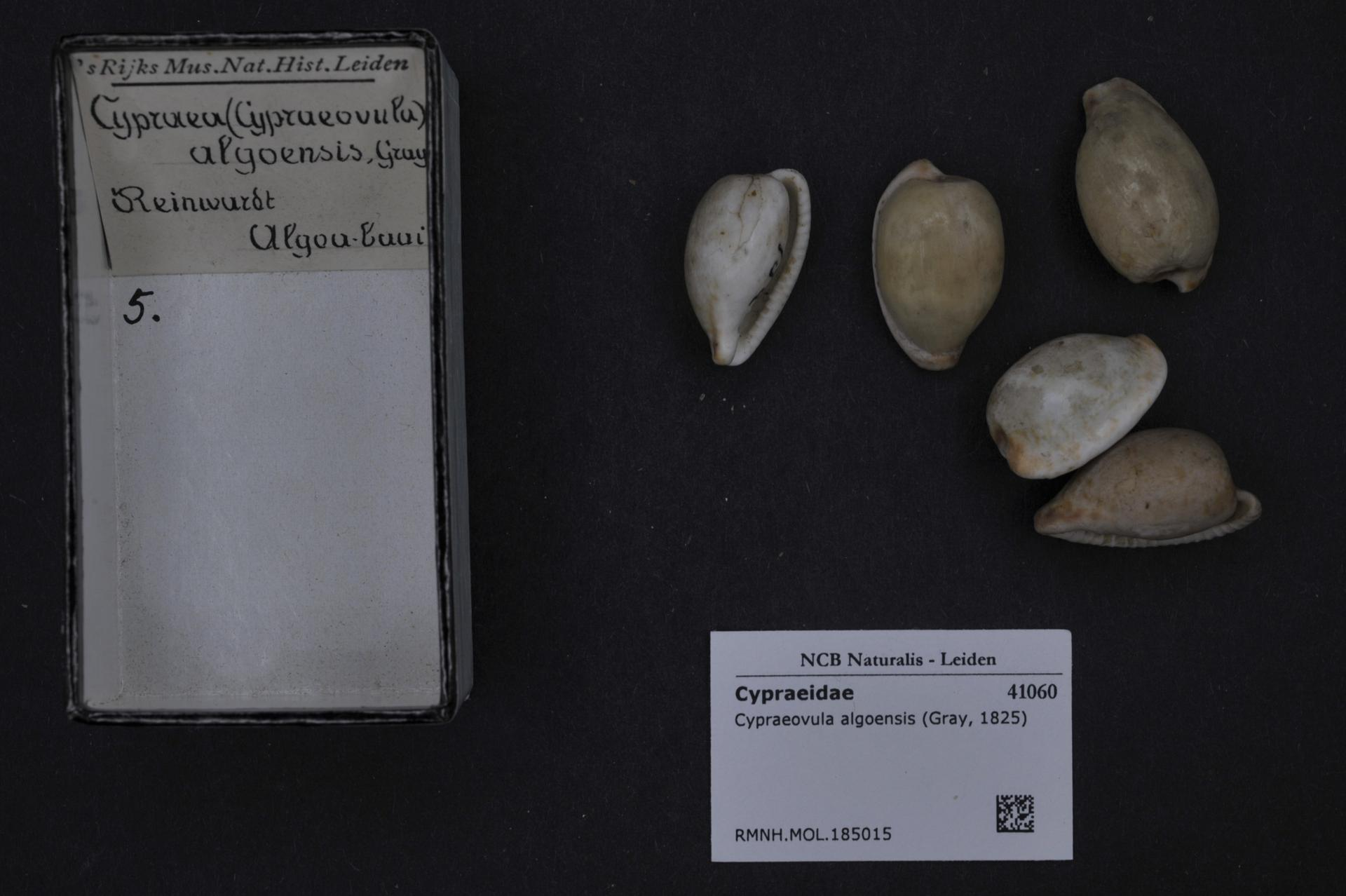

Scientific classification
- Kingdom: Animalia
- Phylum: Mollusca
- Class: Gastropoda
- Subclass: Caenogastropoda
- Order: Littorinimorpha
- Family: Cypraeidae
- Genus: Cypraeovula
- Species: C. algoensis

Binomial name
- Cypraeovula algoensis (Gray, 1825)

Synonyms
- Cypraea algoensis Gray, 1825; Cypraea algoensis f. batsatensis Bodoni, 1985; Cypraeovula algoensis var. sanfrancisca; Chiapponi, 1999

= Cypraeovula algoensis =

Species of gastropod

Cypraeovula algoensis is a species of sea snail, a cowry, a marine gastropod mollusc in the family Cypraeidae, the cowries.

== Subspecies ==
- Cypraeovula algoensis algoensis (Gray, 1825)
- Cypraeovula algoensis liltvedi Lorenz, 2017
- Cypraeovula algoensis namibiensis Massier, 2006
- Cypraeovula algoensis permarginata Lorenz, 1989
