= Darling, South Africa =

Darling
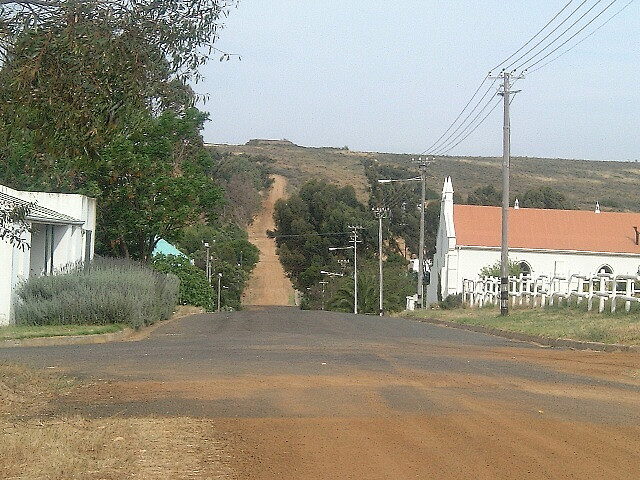
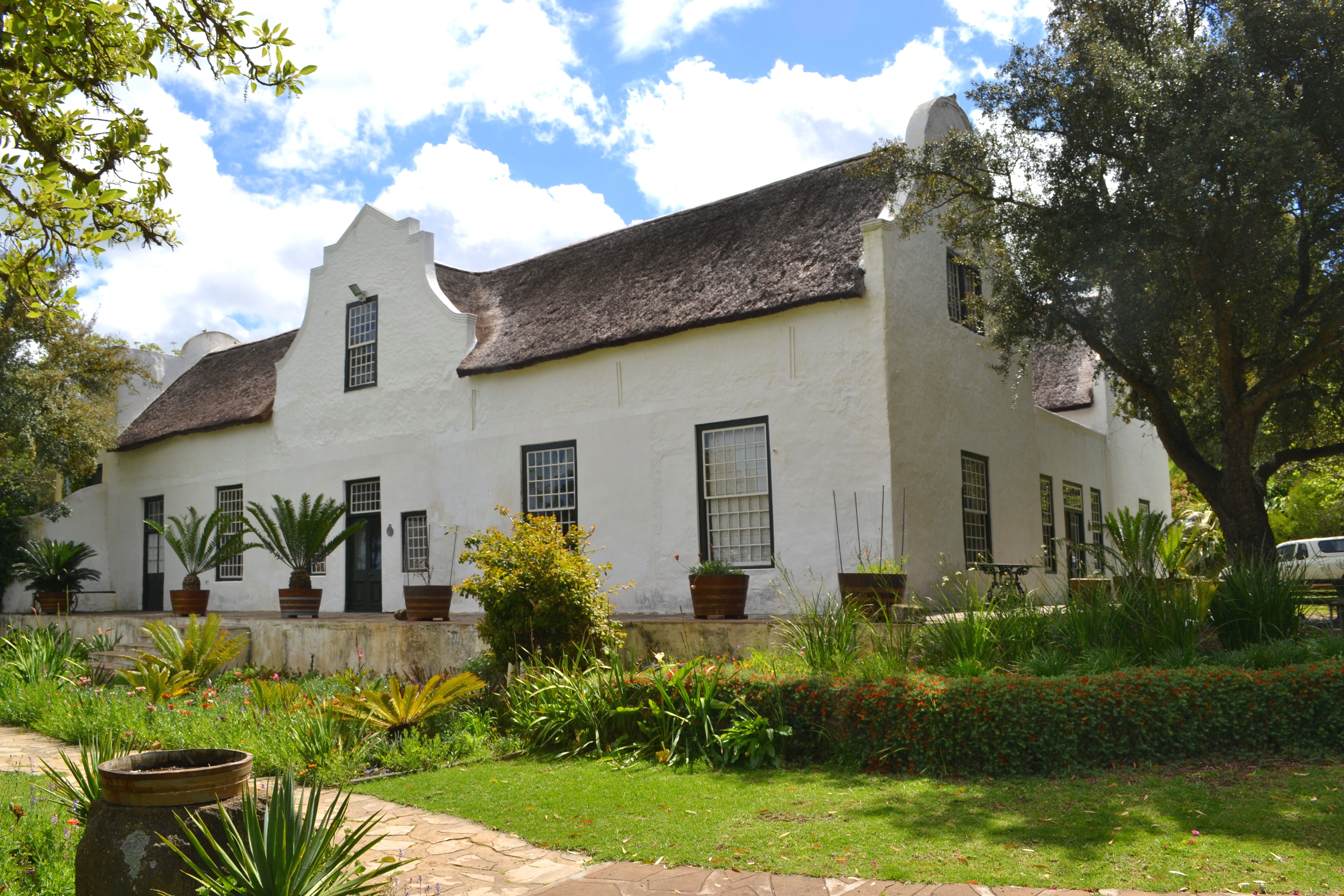
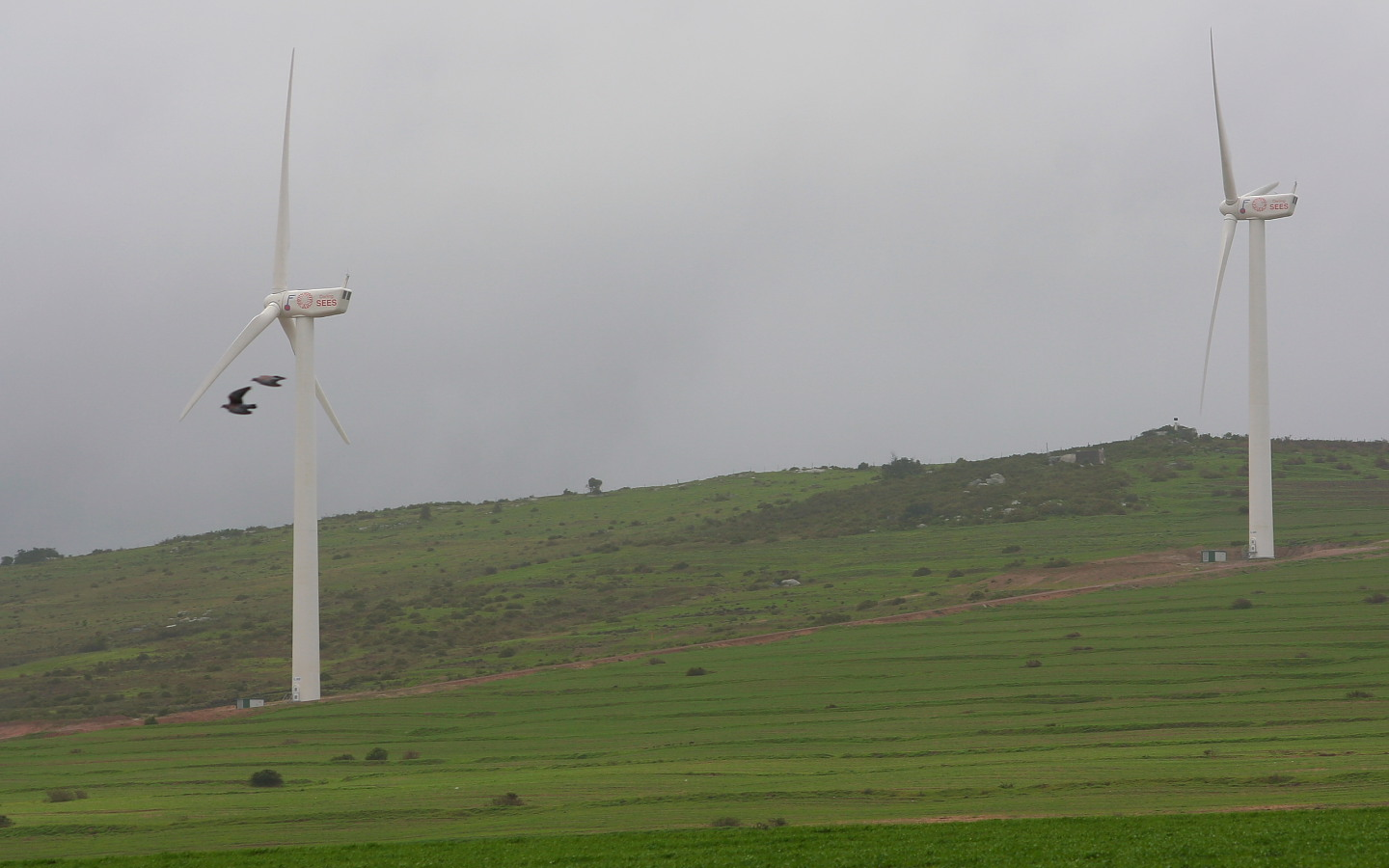
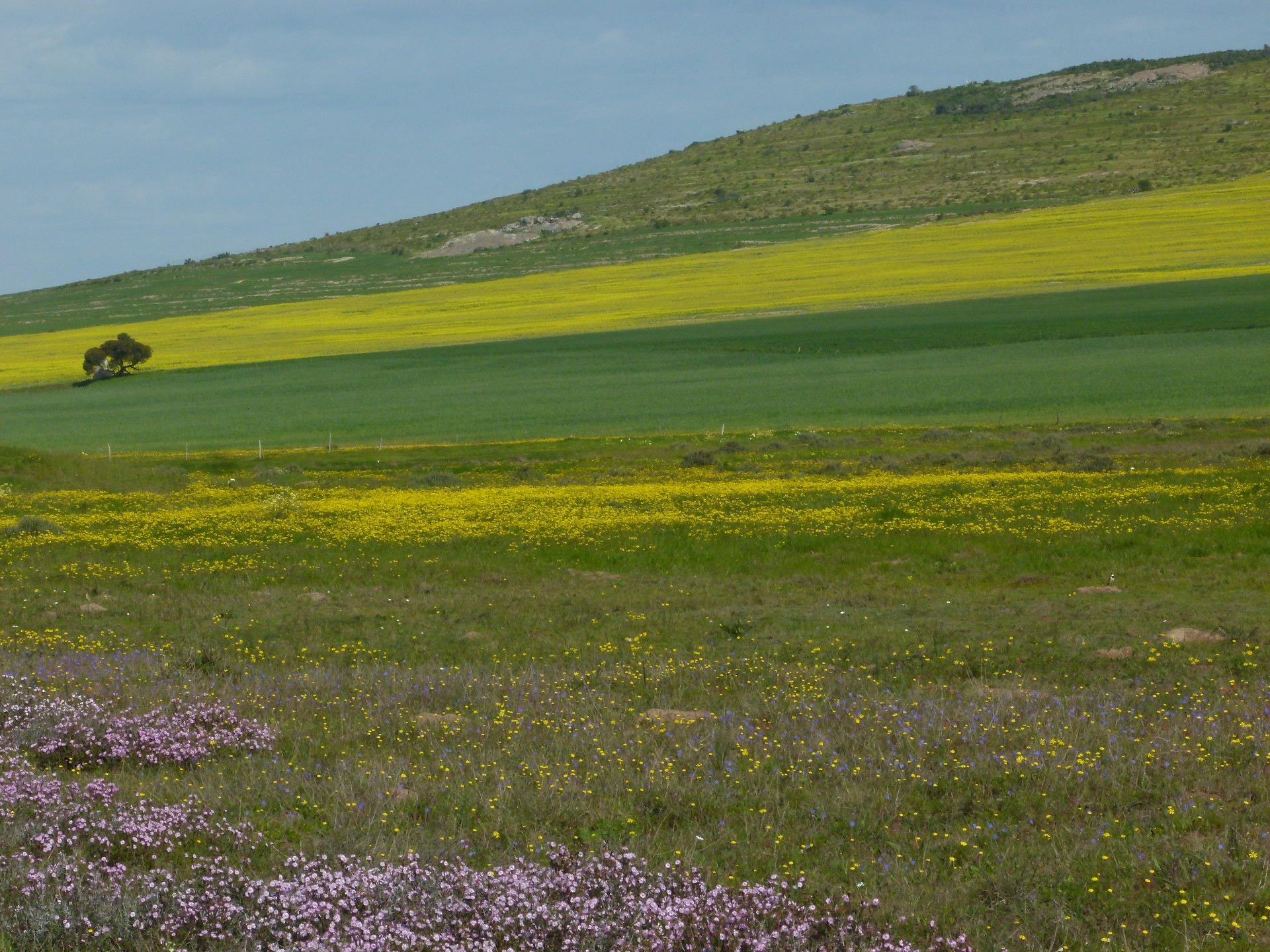
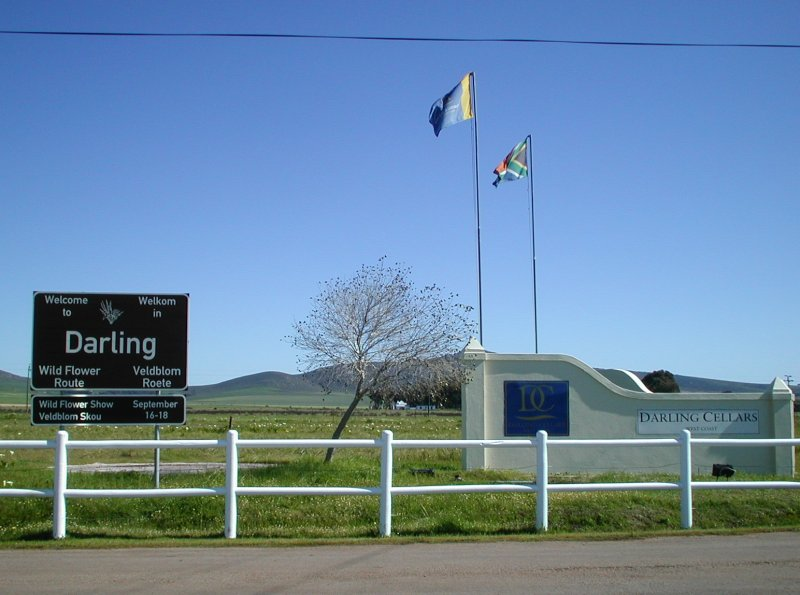
- Clockwise from Top: Street in Darling, Darling Wind Farm, Darling welcome sign, Darling's flower fields, Groote Post Wine Estate.

- Location within Western Cape Location within South Africa
- Coordinates: 33°23′S 18°23′E
- Country: South Africa
- Province: Western Cape
- District: West Coast
- Municipality: Swartland

Area
  - Total: 7.32 km^{2} (2.83 sq mi)

Population (2024)
  - Total: 12,370
  - Density: 1,690/km^{2} (4,380/sq mi)

Racial makeup (2011)
  - White: 77.52%
  - Coloured: 14.09%
  - Black African: 5.32%
  - Indian/Asian: 0.19%
  - Other: 2.89%

First languages (2011)
  - Afrikaans: 60.56%
  - English: 34.39%
  - Other: 5.05%
- Time zone: UTC+2 (SAST)
- Postal code (street): 7345
- PO box: 7345
- Area code: 022
- Website: www.hellodarling.org.za

Darling is a small town in a farming area on the West Coast region of the Western Cape, about 75 km (46.6 mi) from Cape Town, like many small towns situated along the West Coast it is primarily inhabited by Afrikaans speaking people. It is also home to a dairy company bearing the same name.

At the beginning of the 18th century, about 29 farmers lived in an area called Groenkloof and on one of these farms, Langfontein, Darling was founded in 1853. It was named after Sir Charles Henry Darling who came in 1851 to the Cape as Lieutenant Governor.

The Darling Museum showcases the history of the town and the Darling creamery which was established in 1899 by two Swedish settlers, Nils Georg Moller and G. Threnstrom, and was closed in 1950. The museum also holds a collection of large agricultural machines. Darling is famous for its wildflowers and since 1917 the annual Darling Wildflower show is held by the Darling Wildflower Society in the beginning of Spring in September, founded in 1915 by Mrs. Suzanne Malan and Mr. Frederick Duckitt of Waylands.

The Darling Wind Farm is situated between Darling and the coastal town of Yzerfontein. It is operational with plans for expansion.

The South African satirist Pieter-Dirk Uys performs many of his shows as Evita Bezuidenhout at Evita se Perron, a cabaret venue and restaurant in Darling. The adjacent arts and crafts market has been taken over in 2006 by the Darling Trust, a charitable organisation which addresses the problems of impoverished communities in the area through the establishment of grassroots projects. In 1998 the first private school opened its doors in the Swartland area, Darling College, which is close to the entrance of the town on the Malmesbury, South Africa

In 2006, the city launched the Darling Music Experience with the aim to organise small concerts in a rural setting for both classical and more popular music. The festival offers chamber music, popular choir works and jazz. A young local composer is commissioned every year to write a piece for the festival.

== Darling's role in World War 2 ==
By 1942, German U-boat activity off the South African coast was at its peak. In an effort to provide greater security to the Naval convoys plying the sea route the South African Air Force hastily constructed or supplemented existing facilities at six additional airfields around the coast.

The first SAAF flying unit to be based at Darling was 23 Squadron, arriving on the airfield at the beginning of 1943. From here the Ventura aircraft patrolled the western sea approaches to Cape Town at the height of the submarine menace. The unit was strengthened by the arrival of a Ventura detachment from 27 Squadron between February and April 1943.

In November 1943 the Venturas of 29 Operational Training Unit (OTU) were relocated from Nigel to Darling with torpedo training forming a large part of their brief.

On 31 January 1944, construction began on an iron hangar at Darling to ease maintenance problems experienced in the hitherto basic conditions. Temporary buildings were hastily completed and lecture rooms were erected alongside administrative buildings.

On 12 April 1944, Ventura 6457 of 27 Squadron crashed into Dassenberg near Darling shortly after taking off on a training flight, killing the crew of six. On 12 April 1988 the wreckage was discovered and airlifted off the hill for transport to the South African Air Force Museum

Use of Darling's airfield gradually tapered off after the war as AFB Langebaanweg became the epicentre of SAAF operations on the West Coast.

== Gallery ==
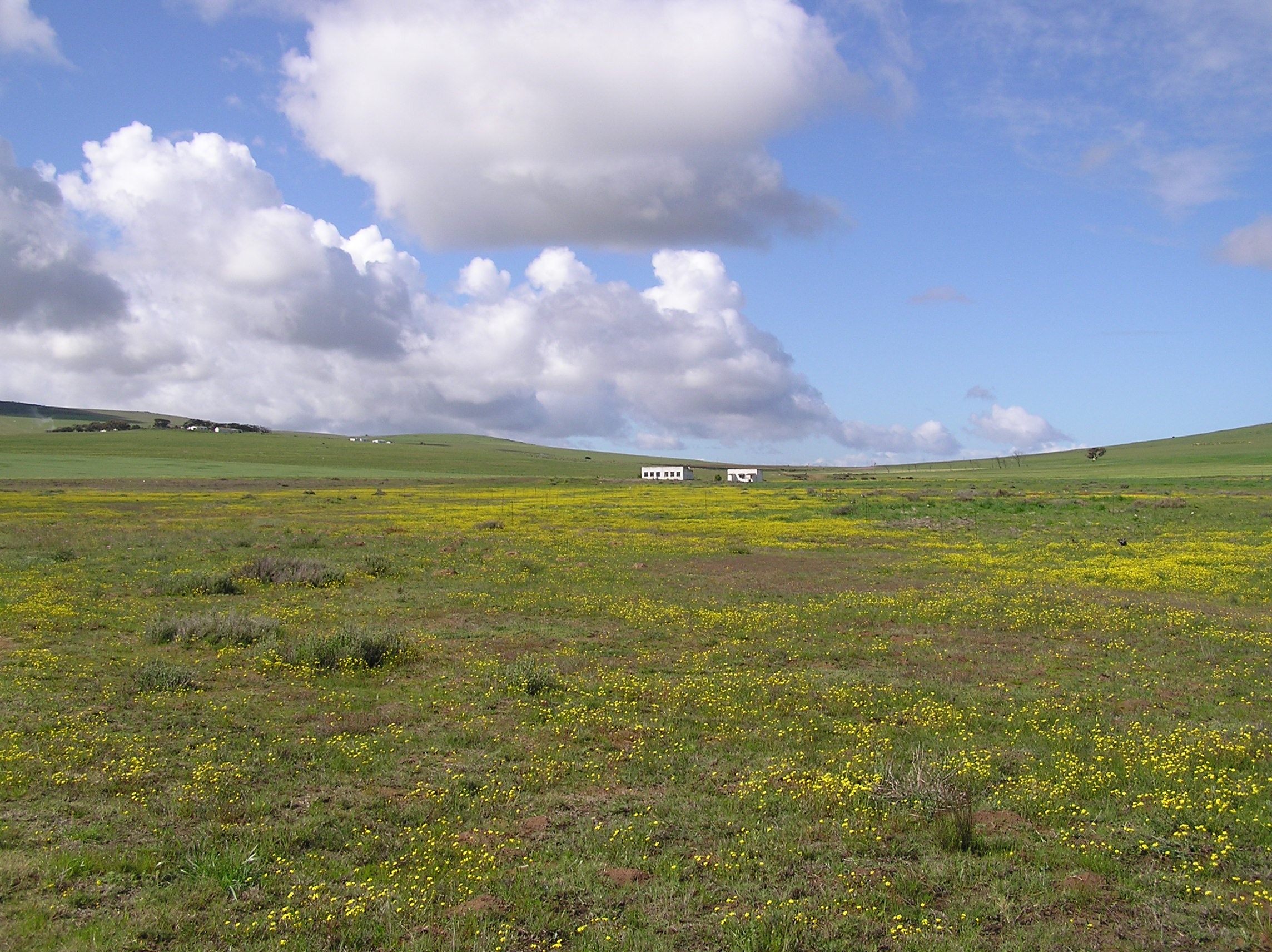
Tienie Versfeld Wildflower Reserve

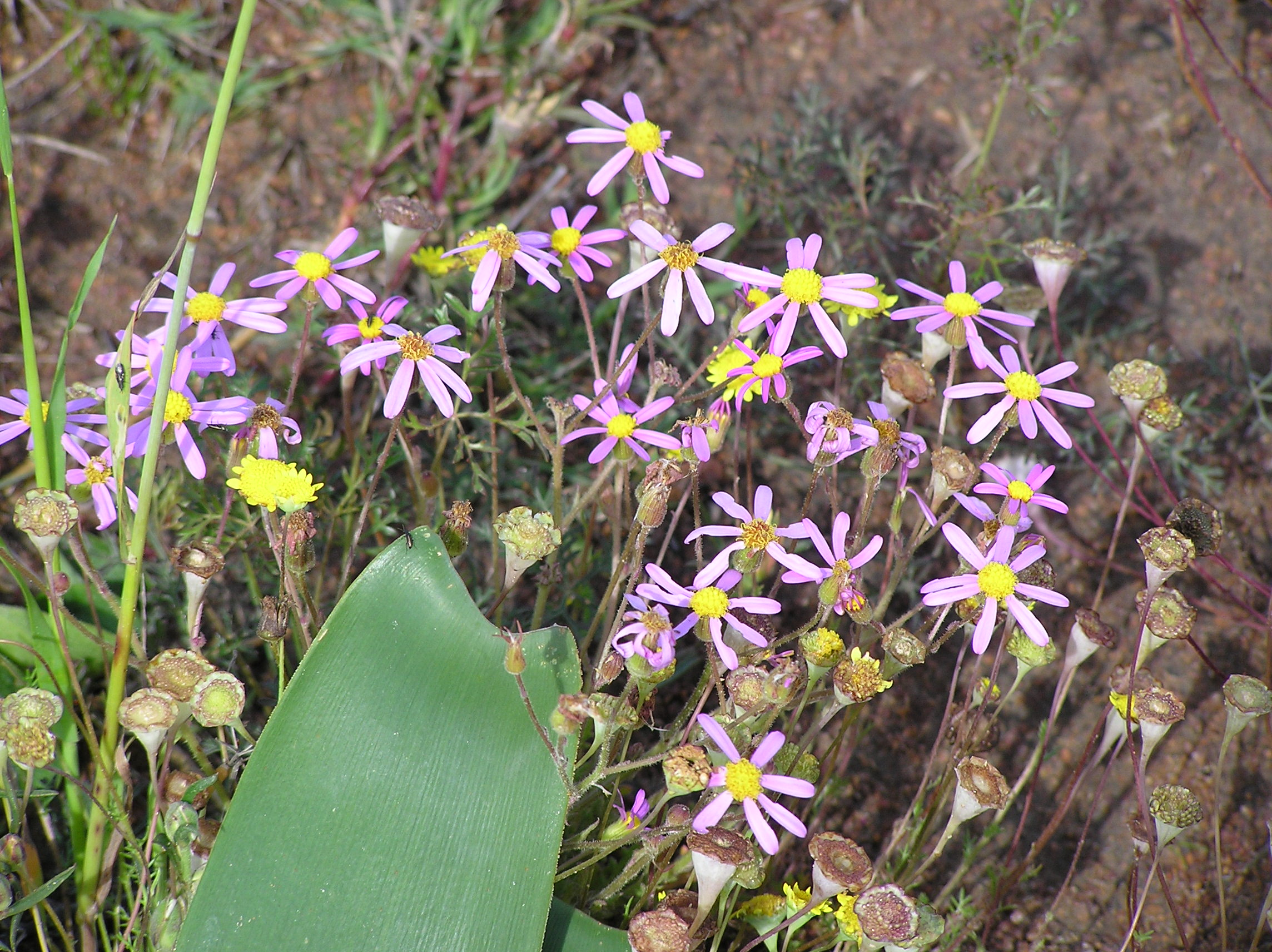
Felicia tenella, Tienie Versfeld Wildflower Reserve

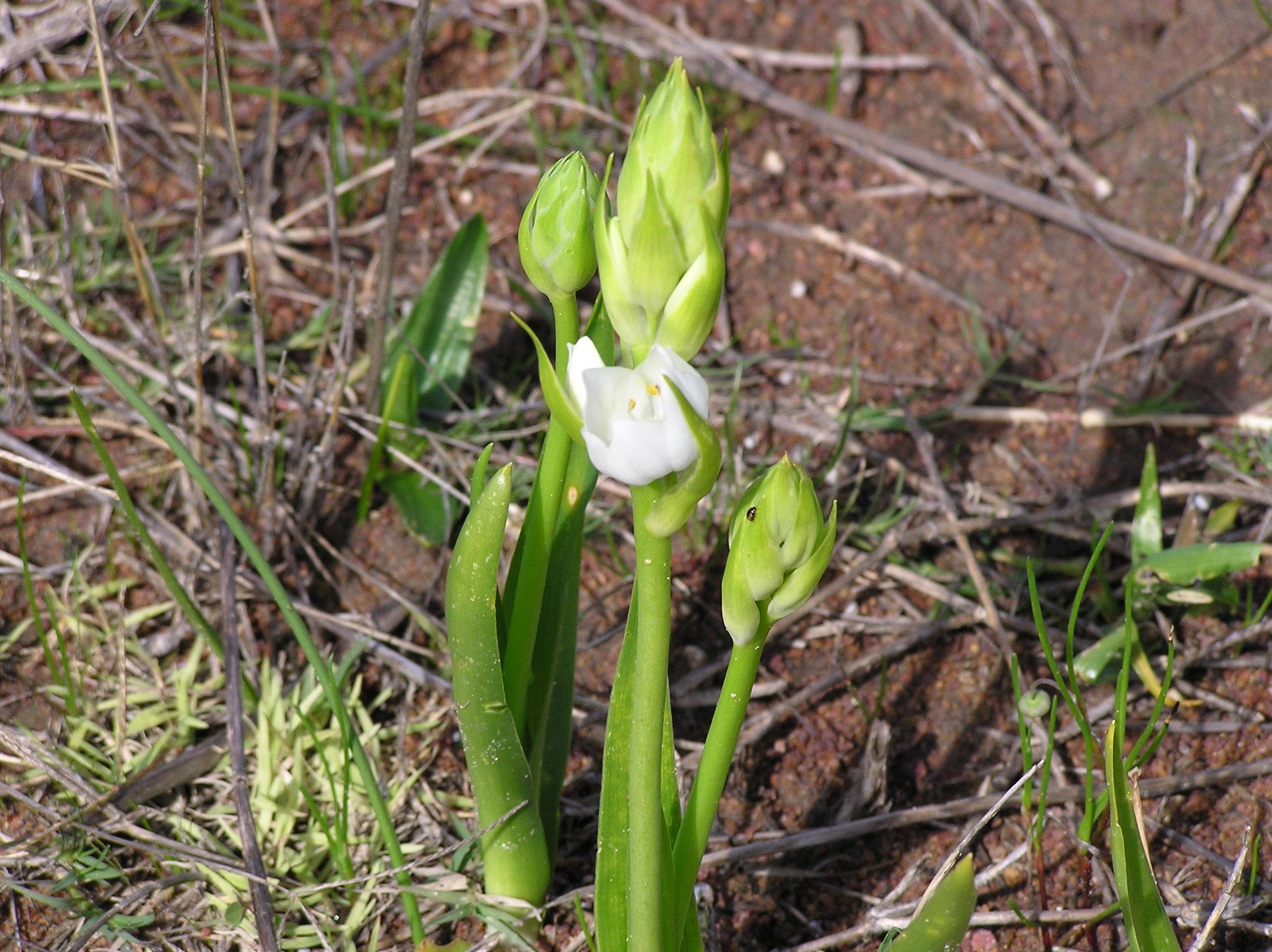
Tienie Versfeld Wildflower Reserve

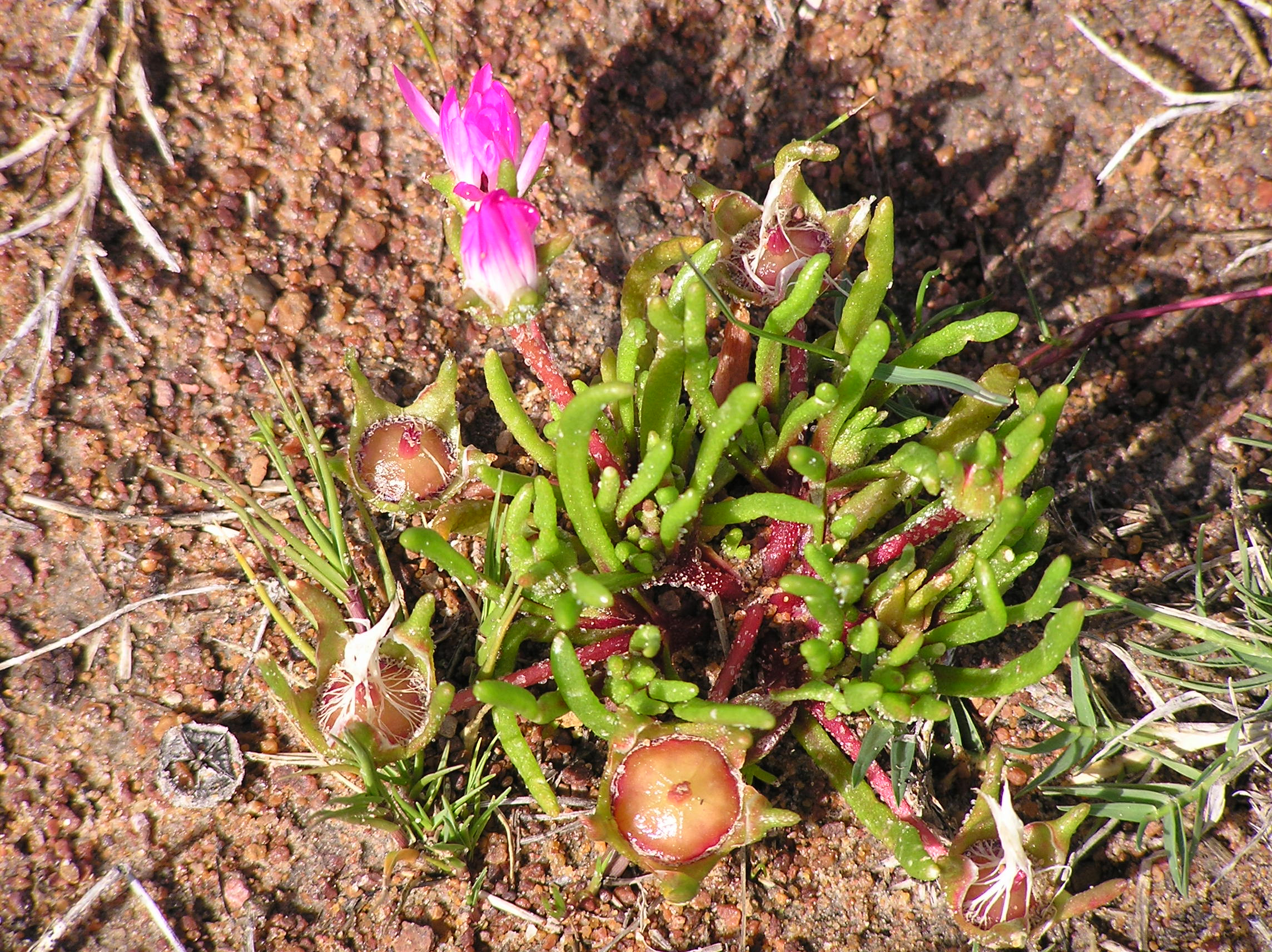
Tienie Versfeld Wildflower Reserve
