= Cypraeovula connelli =

Scientific classification
- Kingdom: Animalia
- Phylum: Mollusca
- Class: Gastropoda
- Subclass: Caenogastropoda
- Order: Littorinimorpha
- Family: Cypraeidae
- Genus: Cypraeovula
- Species: C. connelli

Binomial name
- Cypraeovula connelli (Liltved, 1983)

Synonyms
- Cypraea connelli Liltved, 1983

Species of gastropod

Cypraeovula connelli is a species of sea snail, a cowry, a marine gastropod mollusc in the family Cypraeidae, the cowries.

== Subspecies ==
- Cypraeovula connelli peelae Lorenz, 2002
