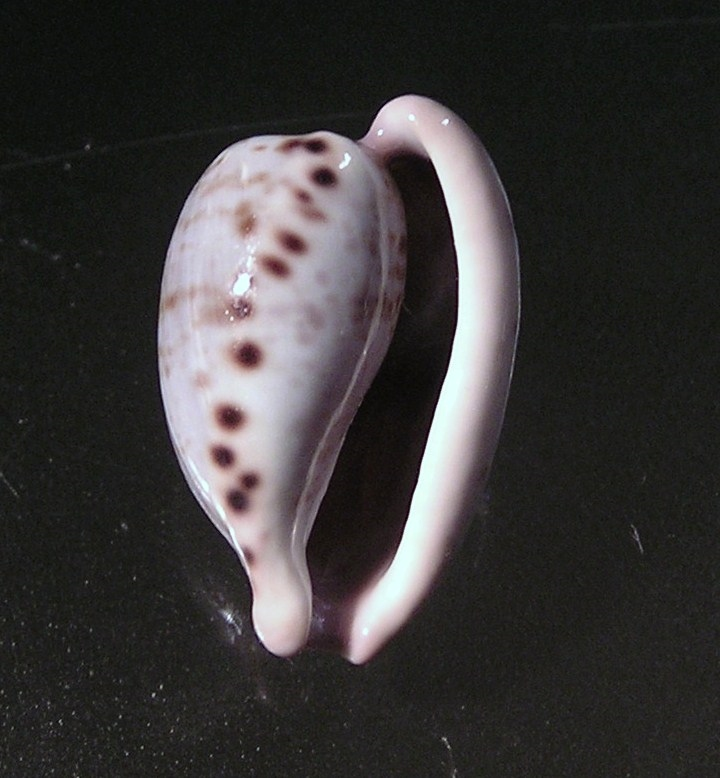
- An apertural view of a shell of Cypraeovula alfredensis, anterior end towards the bottom
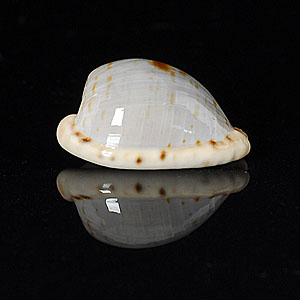
- A lateral view of a shell of Cypraeovula alfredensis, anterior end towards the right

Scientific classification
- Kingdom: Animalia
- Phylum: Mollusca
- Class: Gastropoda
- Subclass: Caenogastropoda
- Order: Littorinimorpha
- Superfamily: Cypraeoidea
- Family: Cypraeidae
- Genus: Cypraeovula; Gray, 1825

Type species
- Cypraea capensis Gray, 1828

Synonyms
- Crossia Shikama, 1974; Cypraea (Cypraeovula) Gray, 1824; Cypraea (Luponia) Gray, 1837; Cypraeovula (Nakayasuia) Shikama, 1971; Luponia Gray, 1837

= Cypraeovula =

Genus of gastropods

Cypraeovula is a genus of sea snails, marine gastropod mollusks in the subfamily Pustulariinae of the family Cypraeidae, the cowries.

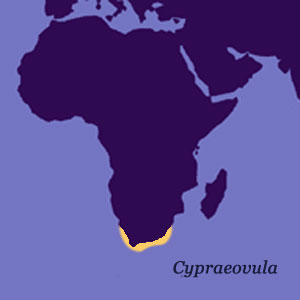
Distribution map of the genus Cypraeovula

== Species ==
Species and subspecies within the genus Cypraeovula include according to the World Register of Marine Species:

- Cypraeovula alfredensis (Schilder & Schilder 1929)
  - Cypraeovula alfredensis transkeiana Lorenz, 2002
- Cypraeovula algoensis (Gray, 1825)
- Cypraeovula amphithales (Melvill, 1888)
- Cypraeovula capensis (Gray, 1828)
- Cypraeovula castanea (Higgins, 1868)
  - Cypraeovula castanea latebrosa Swarts & Liltved, 2000
  - Cypraeovula castanea malani Lorenz & Bruno de Bruin, 2009
- Cypraeovula colligata Lorenz, 2002
- Cypraeovula connelli (Liltved, 1983)
  - Cypraeovula connelli peelae Lorenz, 2002
- Cypraeovula coronata (Schilder, 1930)
  - Cypraeovula coronata debruini Lorenz, 2002
- Cypraeovula cruickshanki (Kilburn, 1972)
- Cypraeovula edentula (Gray, 1825)
- Cypraeovula fuscodentata (Gray, 1825)
  - Cypraeovula fuscodentata grohorum Lorenz, 2002
  - Cypraeovula fuscodentata sphaerica Lorenz, 2002
- Cypraeovula fuscorubra Shaw, 1909
- Cypraeovula immelmani Liltved, 2002
- Cypraeovula iutsui Shikama, 1974
- Cypraeovula kesslerorum Lorenz, 2006
- † Cypraeovula mauvei Aiken, 2016
- Cypraeovula mikeharti Lorenz, 1985
- Cypraeovula volvens Fazzini & Bergonzoni, 2004

Taxon inquirendum

- Cypraeovula cohenae (Burgess, 1965)
