= Cypraeovula volvens =

Scientific classification
- Kingdom: Animalia
- Phylum: Mollusca
- Class: Gastropoda
- Subclass: Caenogastropoda
- Order: Littorinimorpha
- Family: Cypraeidae
- Genus: Cypraeovula
- Species: C. volvens

Binomial name
- Cypraeovula volvens Fazzini & Bergonzoni, 2004

Species of gastropod

Cypraeovula volvens is a species of sea snail, a cowry, a marine gastropod mollusc in the family Cypraeidae, the cowries.

== Description ==
Shell spheroid and umbilicate, light and fragile, small (20–23 mm). Dorsum variably colored, clear pink to dark violet, with rather small brown spots laterally, decreasing in size. Flanks weakly pointed and sometimes provided with small protuberances. Labial edge orange-pink, rather thickened, with the anterior labial extremity weakly evident and the posterior labial one more developed. Base mostly clear, with margins colored and patterned as the dorsum; aperture curved and narrow. Labial dentition developed and coarse. Columellar dentition thinner, weakly evident, disappearing in the more callous specimens. Peristome smooth or with fine ribbing. Fossula rather thickened, shallow, with 3-4 well developed denticles in fully grown specimens. Soft parts generally translucent; head, mantle and foot cream-grey and weakly spotted with black. Mantle provided with numerous thread-like and semitransparent papillae.

== Distribution ==
The holotype and paratypes were dredged in June 2003 on rocky bottoms by Philip J. Jooste off the eastern coast of South Africa, NE of Port Alfred, at a depth of about 88–100 m.
