= Dassen Island =

Ramsar site island in South Africa

Native name: Dasseneiland
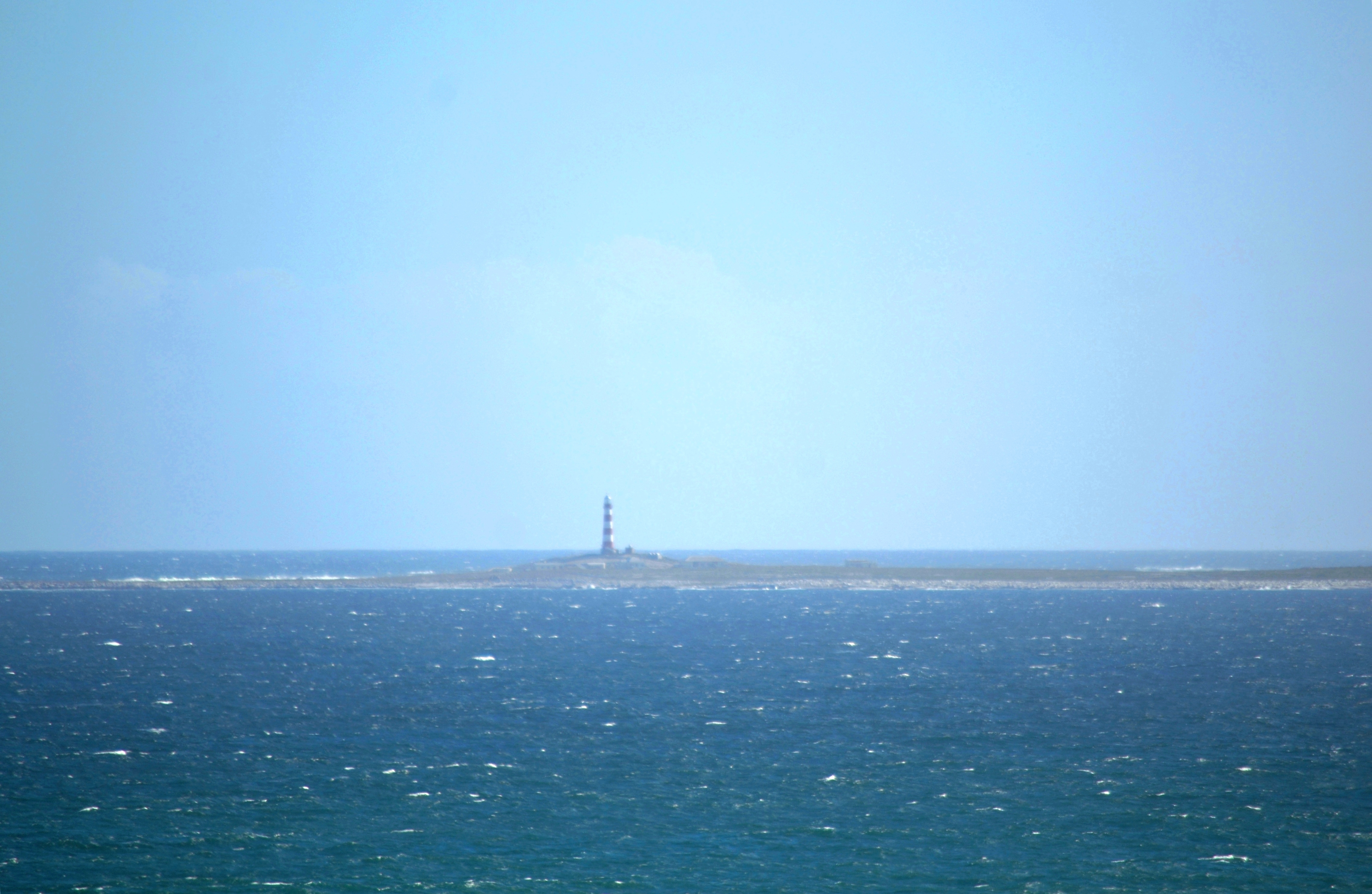
- Dassen Island and lighthouse, 9 km (6 mi) off the coast of Yzerfontein

- Location within Western Cape

Geography
- Coordinates: 33°25′24″S 18°05′14″E
- Area: 2.60 km^{2} (1.00 sq mi)

Administration
- South Africa

Demographics
- Population: 0 (2011)

Ramsar Wetland
- Official name: Dassen Island Nature Reserve
- Designated: 29 March 2019
- Reference no.: 2383

Dassen Island is an uninhabited South African island in the Atlantic Ocean. It is situated about 10 km (6 mi) west of Yzerfontein and 55 km (34 mi) north of Cape Town. The flat and low-lying island measures about 3.1 km (1.9 mi) long northwest–southeast and 1 km (0.6 mi) wide, with an area of 2.73 km^{2} (1.05 sq mi). It is a proclaimed nature reserve.

In Dutch "das", the plural being "dassen", is a badger (Meles meles). In Dutch/Afrikaans the word "dassie" means "rock-hyrax" or "rock-badger" and the island is named after the colonies of hyraxes (Procavia capensis) encountered there by the discoverers. Named Ilha Branca ('white island') by the early Portuguese mariners, it was renamed Elizabeth Eiland by Joris van Spilbergen in 1601. The form Dasseneiland (Dutch/Afrikaans) is preferred for official purposes. It was also occasionally referred to as Penguin Island.

The island is underpinned by a fine-grained tourmaline granite, with a few zones of biotite granite. The intrusive rocks (late Precambrian) are in part covered by sand. Along much of the shoreline large, rounded boulders protrude from the sand to heights just above the high water mark. Although temporary pans form during the wet season (winter) in the interior, there is in general little fresh water on the island.

Except on its eastern side, Dassen Island is surrounded by reefs. Many ships have been shipwrecked here.

== African penguin colony ==
Rocky paths on the island have been worn by generations of penguins coming ashore to roost and nest. The island is home to a breeding colony of African Penguin which is in decline. In the 1950s it was home to tens of thousands of the animals. In 1975 the population was an estimate 60,000 birds. In the year 2000, the population was an estimated 56,000.

The population has been adversely impacted by the commercial exploitation of their eggs, collection of guano (which the birds require to burrow in), and the overfishing of prey species (including pilchard). Dassen Island is also on a major shipping route, and in 1975, roughly 650 oil tankers passed by each month. Oil pollution stemming from bilge dumping and occasional major oil spills (such as the MV Treasure oil spill) have also impacted the population.

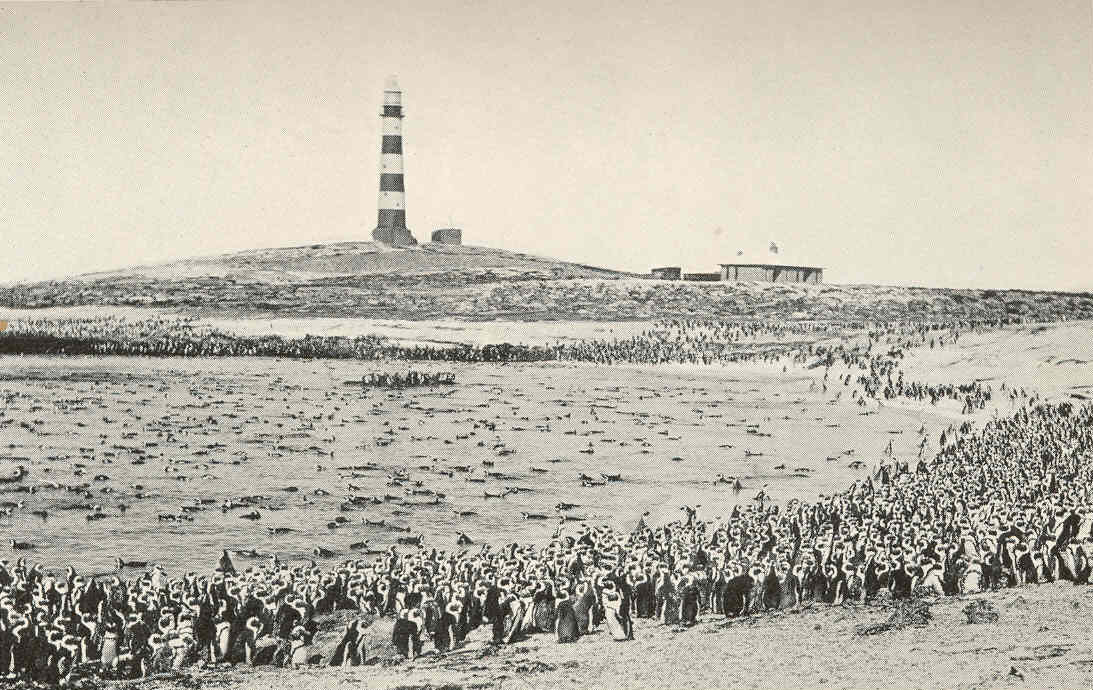
African penguin (Spheniscus demersus).

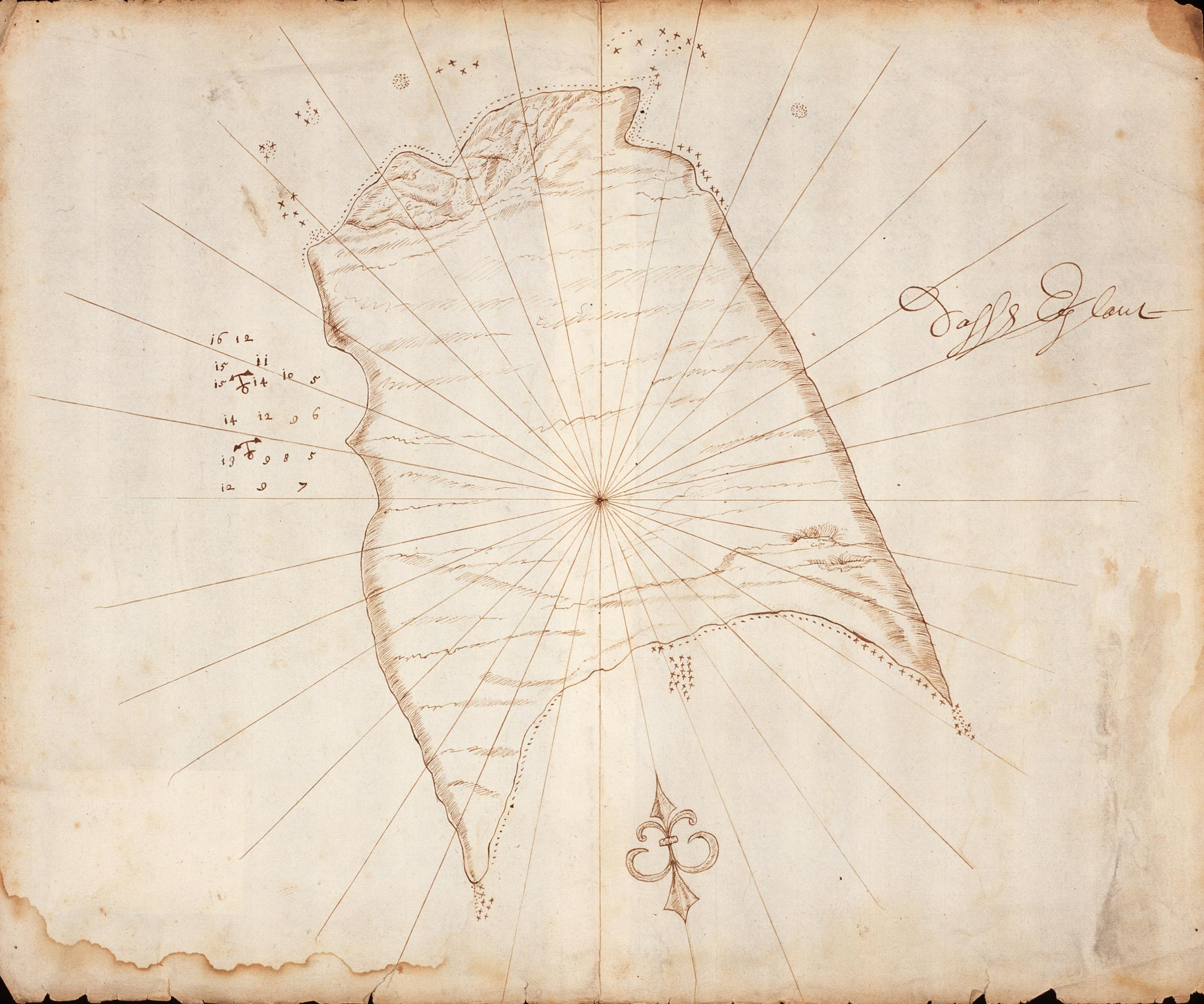
Nautical chart s. XVII
