= Yzerfontein =

Small harbour town on the west coast of South Africa

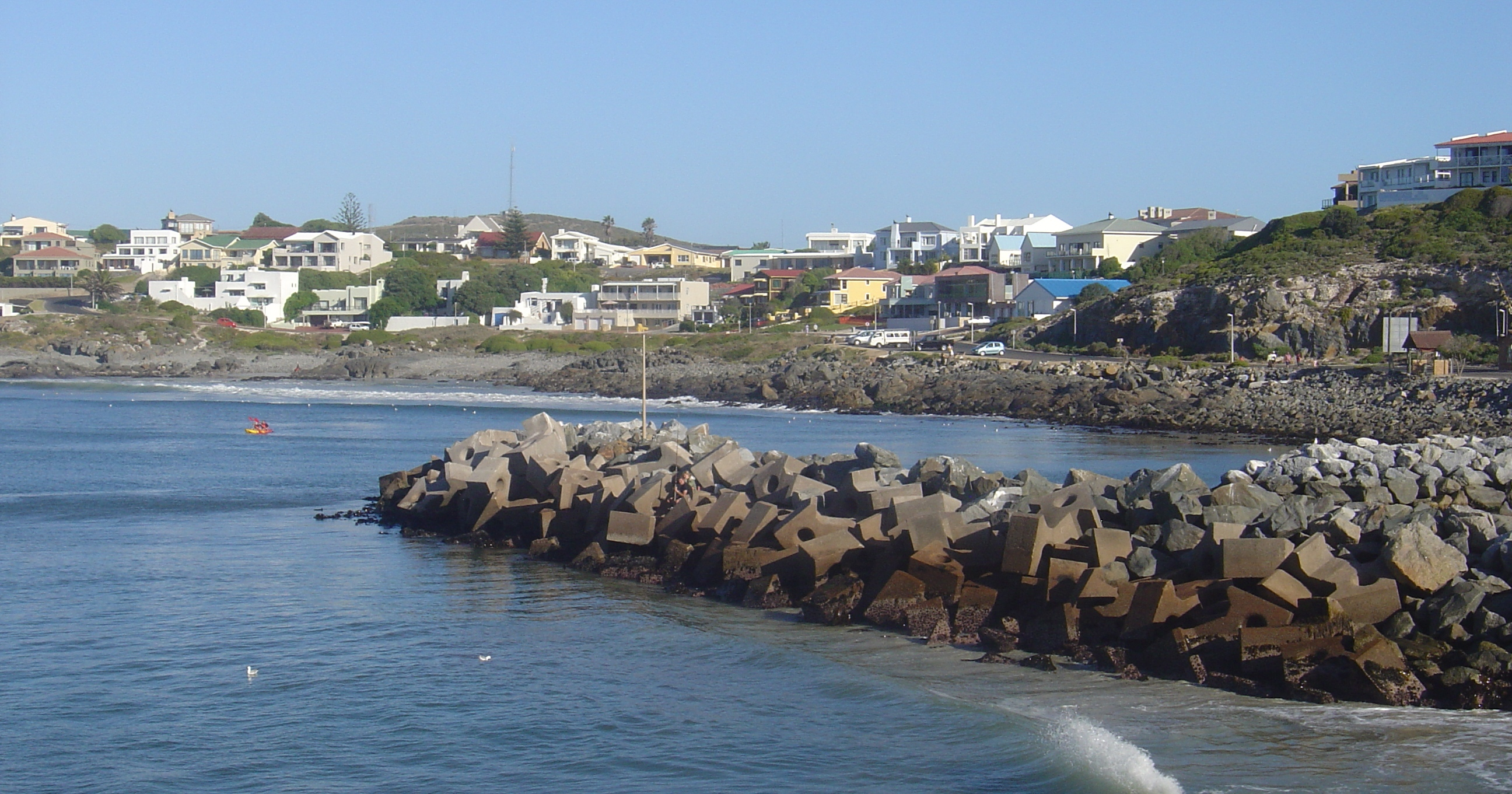
- Yzerfontein seen from the town harbour

- Location within Western Cape Location within South Africa
- Coordinates: 33.333°S 18.162°E
- Country: South Africa
- Province: Western Cape
- District: West Coast
- Municipality: Swartland
- Established: 1937

Area
  - Total: 6.68 km^{2} (2.58 sq mi)

Population (2016)
  - Total: 2,170
  - Density: 325/km^{2} (841/sq mi)

Racial makeup (2011)
  - Black African: 8.9%
  - Coloured: 5.6%
  - Indian/Asian: 0.5%
  - White: 81.4%
  - Other: 3.5%

First languages (2011)
  - Afrikaans: 71.5%
  - English: 25.3%
  - Xhosa: 1.2%
  - Other: 1.9%
- Time zone: UTC+2 (SAST)
- PO box: 7351
- Area code: 022
- Website: www.yzerfontein.net

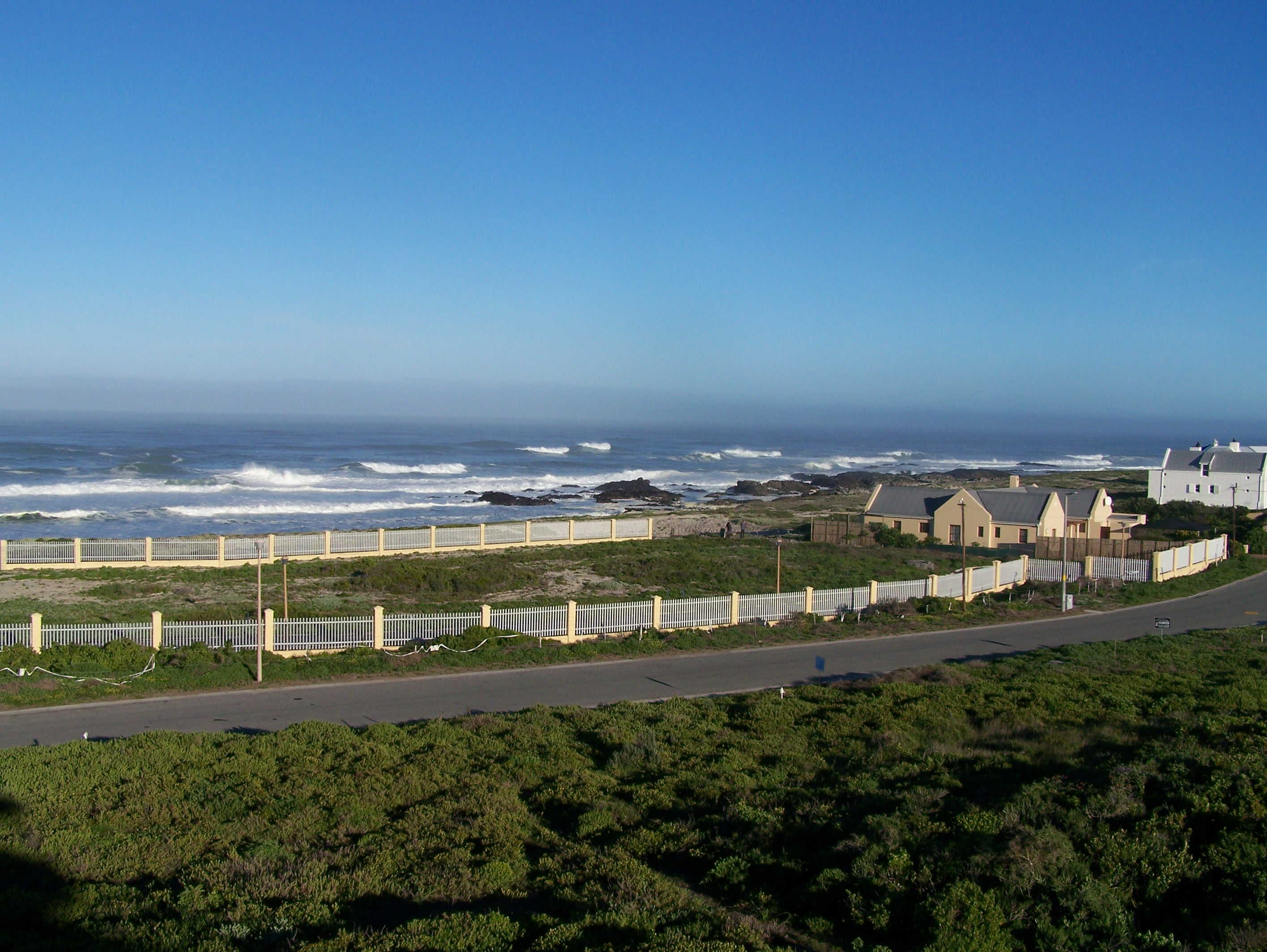
Yzerfontein in 2006

Yzerfontein, or Ysterfontein, is a small harbour town with about 1200 inhabitants on the west coast of South Africa about 90 km north of Cape Town. The name in Afrikaans means "Iron Fountain".The town started out when the farm 'Yzerfontein' was bought by the Katz-family in the 1930s. Then they started dividing the farm into plots. The main sources of income are tourism (especially during the wildflower season from August to October), mining and fishing.

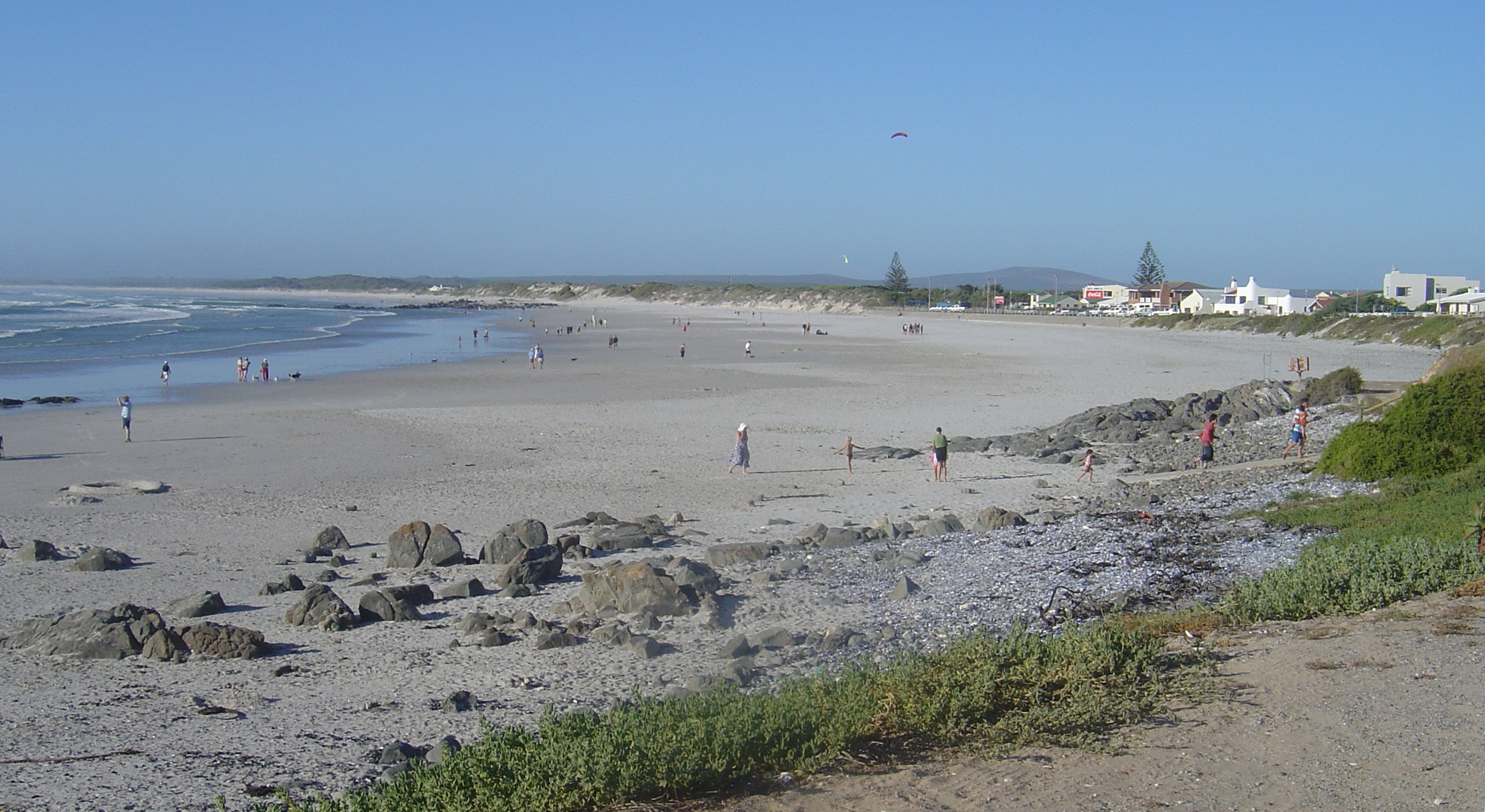
Beach at Yzerfontein

Yzerfontein is known for its Sixteen Mile Beach, stretching north from the main beach of the town, to the West Coast National Park, which borders the town. Dassen Island, another nature reserve, is about 10 km offshore.

Yzerfontein is the landing point for the ACE and WACS submarine communications cables.

Outside of the town is the Darling Wind Farm. This is producing power and there are plans for expansion. The !Khwa ttu San heritage center is 13 kilometers inland to the East.

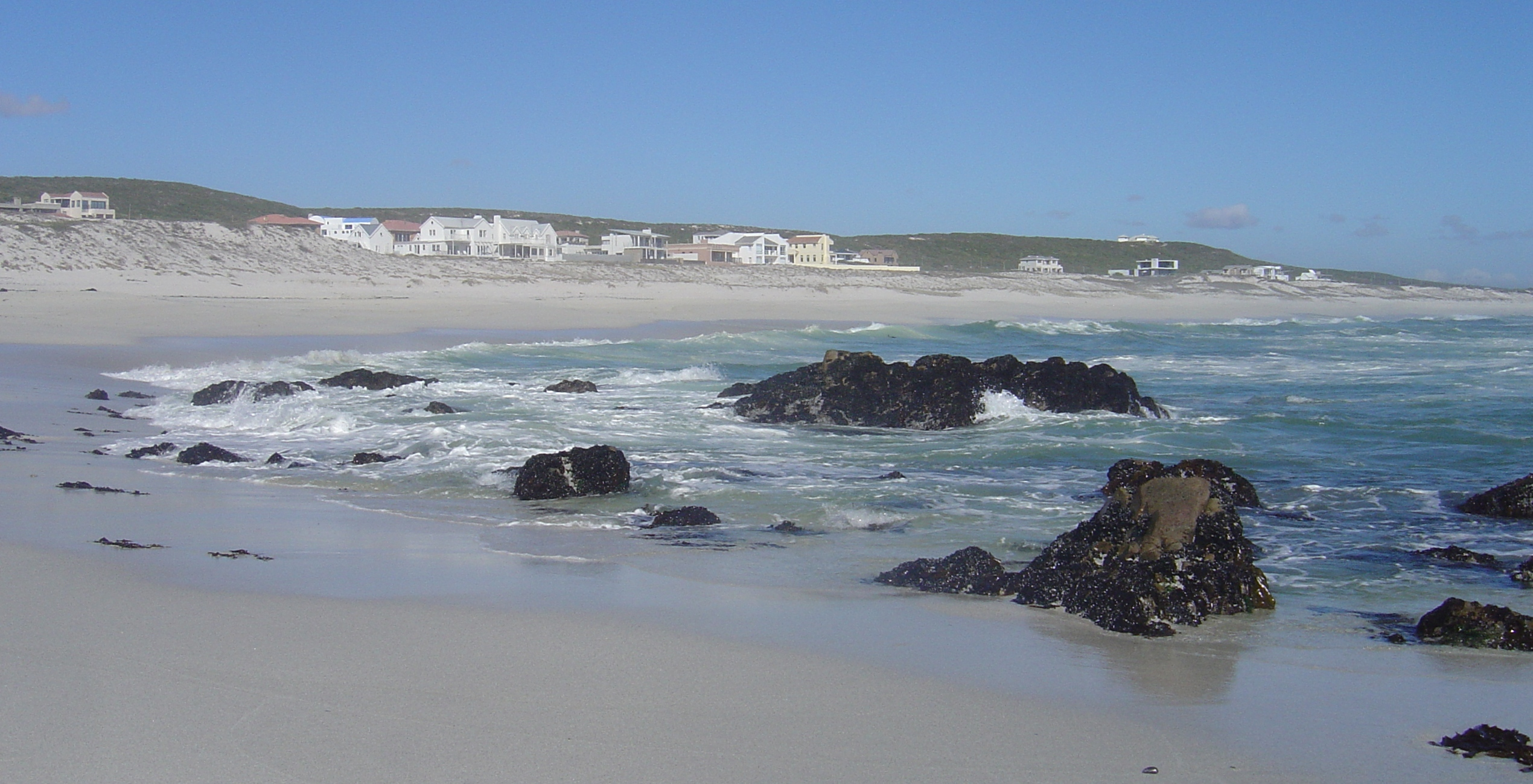
Pearl Bay suburb, a new development in the south of Yzerfontein

.

The Yzerfontein salt pan is a 116 hectares (287 acres) coastal salt pan, just northeast of the town. It was formerly mined for salt, and is currently mined for gypsum.
