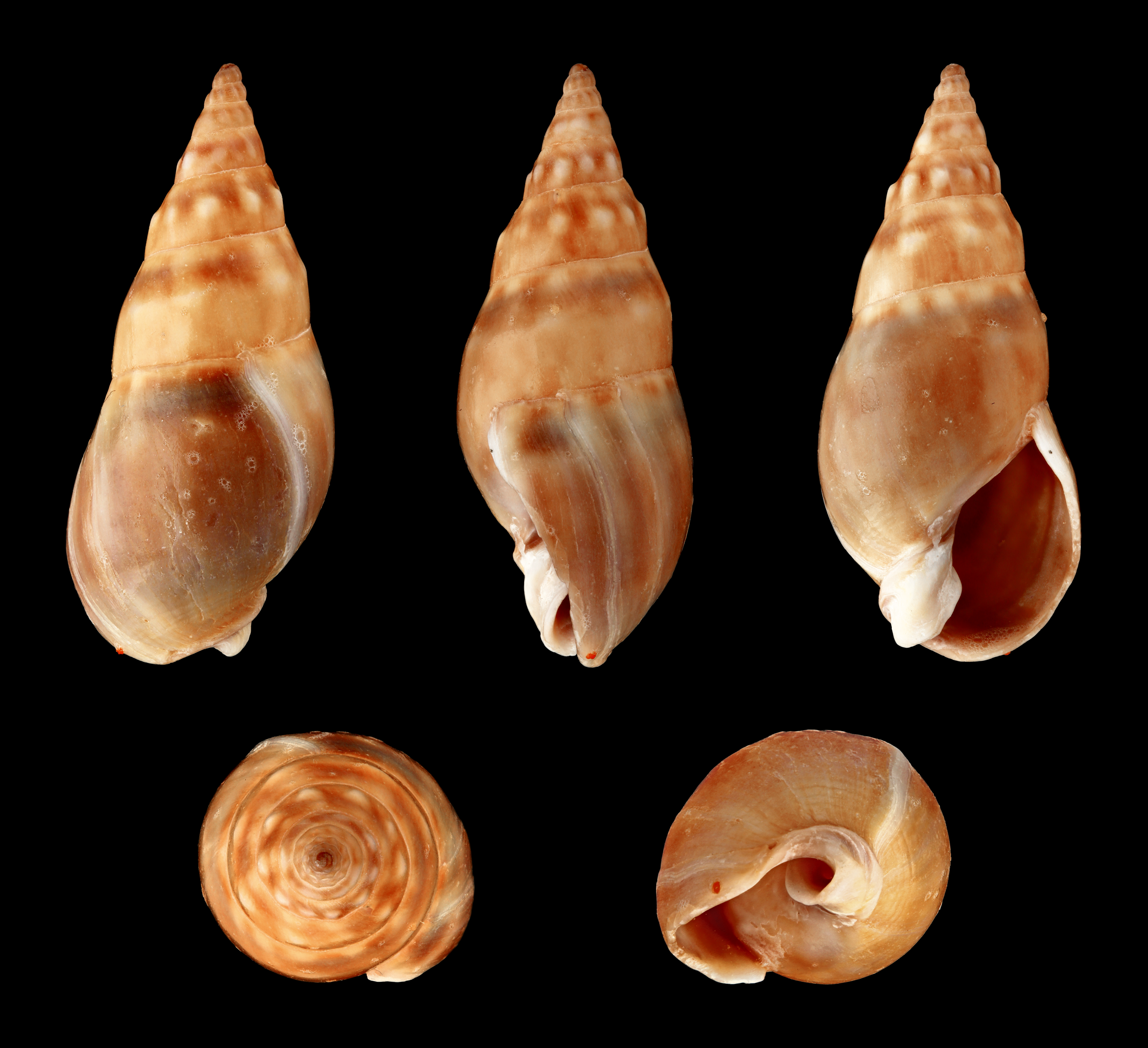
- Five views of a shell of Dorsanum miran (Bruguiere, 1799)

Scientific classification
- Kingdom: Animalia
- Phylum: Mollusca
- Class: Gastropoda
- Subclass: Caenogastropoda
- Order: Neogastropoda
- Superfamily: Buccinoidea
- Family: Nassariidae
- Genus: Dorsanum; Gray, 1847

Type species
- Buccinum politum Lamarck, 1822

Synonyms
- Bullia (Dorsanum) Gray, 1847; Dorsanum (Dorsanum) Gray, 1847 · accepted, alternate representation; † Duplicata Korobkov, 1955; † Duplicatula Kolesnikov, 1939

= Dorsanum =

Genus of gastropods

Dorsanum is a genus of sea snails, marine gastropod mollusks in the subfamily Dorsaninae of the family Nassariidae, the Nassa mud snails or dog whelks.

== Species ==
Subgenera :

- Dorsanum (Dorsanum) Gray, 1847

Species within the genus Dorsanum include:

- † Dorsanum estotiensis Lozouet, 1999
- † Dorsanum gaasensis Lozouet, 1999
- † Dorsanum javanum K. Martin, 1931
- † Dorsanum laeve (van Voorthuysen, 1944)
- † Dorsanum meyni (Beyrich, 1854)
- Dorsanum miran (Bruguière, 1789)
- † Dorsanum subpolitum (d'Orbigny, 1852)

Species brought into synonymy

- Dorsanum (Adinus) H. Adams & A. Adams, 1853 : synonym of Bullia Gray, 1833
- Dorsanum (Adinus) javanum K. Martin, 1931 represented as Dorsanum javanum K. Martin, 1931 (alternate representation)
- Dorsanum belangeri (Kiener, 1834): synonym of Bullia tranquebarica (Röding, 1798)
- Dorsanum granulosum (Lamarck, 1822): synonym of Naytia granulosa (Lamarck, 1822)
- Dorsanum gruveli Dautzenberg, 1910: synonym of Bullia gruveli (Dautzenberg, 1910)
- Dorsanum mauritianum (Gray, 1839): synonym of Bullia mauritiana Gray, 1839
- Dorsanum moniliferum (Kiener, 1834) : synonym of Buccinanops monilifer (Kiener, 1834)
- Dorsanum terebraeforme Dautzenberg, 1913: synonym of Bullia terebraeformis (Dautzenberg, 1912)
