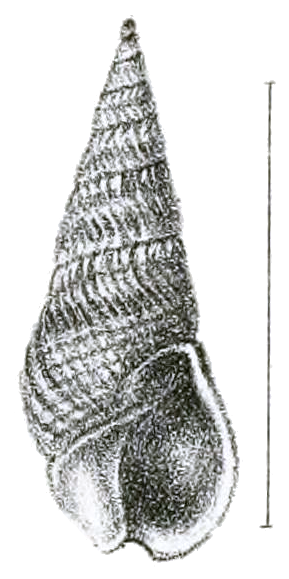
- Black and white drawing of an apertural view of a shell of Bullia mozambicensis. The scale bar is probably 1 inch.

Scientific classification
- Kingdom: Animalia
- Phylum: Mollusca
- Class: Gastropoda
- Subclass: Caenogastropoda
- Order: Neogastropoda
- Superfamily: Buccinoidea
- Family: Nassariidae
- Genus: Bullia; Griffith, 1834

Type species
- Bullia semiplicata Gray in Griffith & Pidgeon, 1833

Synonyms
- Adinopsis Odhner, 1923 (preoccupied by Adinopsis Cameron 1918 (Coleoptera)); Adinus H. Adams & A. Adams, 1853; Buccinum (Bullia); Bullia (Adinus) H. Adams & A. Adams, 1853; Bullia (Bullia) Gray, 1833; Bullia (Cereobullia) Melvill & Peile, 1924; Bullia (Leiodomus) Swainson, 1840; Bullia (Pseudostrombus) Mörch, 1852; Bulliana Gray, 1842; Dorsanum (Adinus) H. Adams & A. Adams, 1853; Dorsanum (Fluviodorsum) Boettger, 1885; Leiodomus Swainson, 1840; Pseudostrombus Moerch, 1852

= Bullia =

Genus of gastropods

Bullia is a genus of sea snails, marine gastropod mollusks in the family Nassariidae, the Nassa mud snails or dog whelks.

== Description ==
The animal is without eyes. The tentacles are long and slender. The foot is greatly expanded, and bifid behind.

The shell is ovate or turreted. The spire is more or less acuminated, the sutures enamelled. The inner lip is excavated in the middle, callous posteriorly. The aperture is oval and moderate.

== Species ==
The following subgenera are recognized:

- Bullia (Bullia) Gray, 1834
- Bullia (Cereobullia) Melvill & Peile, 1924

Species within the genus Bullia include:

- Bullia aikeni Kilburn, 1978
- Bullia ancillaeformis Smith, 1906
- Bullia annulata (Lamarck, 1816)
- † Bullia bantamensis Oostingh, 1933
- Bullia callosa (W. Wood, 1828)
- Bullia cataphracta Kilburn, 1978
- Bullia ceroplasta Melvill, 1898
- Bullia chitanii Yokoyama, 1926 †
- Bullia crosseana Tapparone-Canefri, 1882 (nomen dubium)
- Bullia cumingiana Dunker, 1852
- Bullia digitalis (Dillwyn, 1817)
- Bullia diluta (Krauss, 1848)
- Bullia elegans Dunker, 1857 (nomen dubium)
- Bullia granulosa (Lamarck, 1822) - synonym: Bullia fusca Craven
- Bullia gruveli (Dautzenberg, 1910)
- Bullia indusindica Melvill, 1898
- Bullia insignis Turton, 1932 (nomen dubium)
- Bullia jucunda Turton, 1932
- Bullia kurrachensis Angas, 1877
- Bullia laevissima (Gmelin, 1791)
- † Bullia litoralis Oostingh, 1933
- Bullia livida Reeve, 1846
- Bullia martinii Gray, 1843 (nomen dubium)
- Bullia mauritiana Gray, 1839
- Bullia melanoides (Deshayes, 1832)
- Bullia mirepicta Bozzetti, 2007
- Bullia mozambicensis Smith, 1878
- Bullia natalensis (Krauss, 1848).
- Bullia nitida Sowerby, 1895
- Bullia nuttalli Kilburn, 1978
- Bullia osculata Sowerby III, 1900
- Bullia osseum Menke, 1829 (nomen dubium)
- Bullia othaeitensis (Bruguière, 1789)
- Bullia perlucida Bozzetti, 2014
- Bullia perryi Jay, 1855 (nomen dubium)
- Bullia persica Smith, 1878
- † Bullia provecta Beets, 1942
- Bullia pulchella Turton, 1932 (nomen dubium)
- Bullia pura Melvill, 1885
- Bullia rhodostoma Reeve, 1847
- Bullia rogersi Smythe & Chatfield, 1981
- Bullia semiplicata Gray, 1833
- Bullia sendersi Kilburn, 1978
- Bullia similis Sowerby, 1897
- Bullia skoogi (Odhner, 1923)
- Bullia smytheae Moolenbeek & Dekker, 1994
- † Bullia sundaica Oostingh, 1939
- Bullia tamsiana Dunker, 1853
- Bullia tenuis Reeve, 1846
- Bullia terebraeformis Dautzenberg
- Bullia townsendi Melvill, 1912
- Bullia tranquebarica (Röding, 1798)
- Bullia trifasciata Smith, 1904
- Bullia truncata Reeve, 1846
- Bullia turrita Gray, 1839
- Bullia vittata (Linnaeus, 1767)

Synonyms:

- Bullia belangeri Kiener: synonym of Bullia tranquebarica (Röding, 1798)
- Bullia cinerea Preston, 1906: synonym of Nassarius dorsatus (Röding, 1798)
- Bullia fuscus Gray in Dieffenbach, 1834 is a synonym of Impages hectica (Linnaeus, 1758)
- Bullia miran (Bruguière, 1789) is a synonym of Dorsanum miran (Bruguière, 1789)
- Bullia truncata Reeve, 1846: synonym of Adinus truncatus (Reeve, 1846)
- Bullia valida Dunker, 1852 is a synonym of Pusionella valida (Dunker, 1852)
