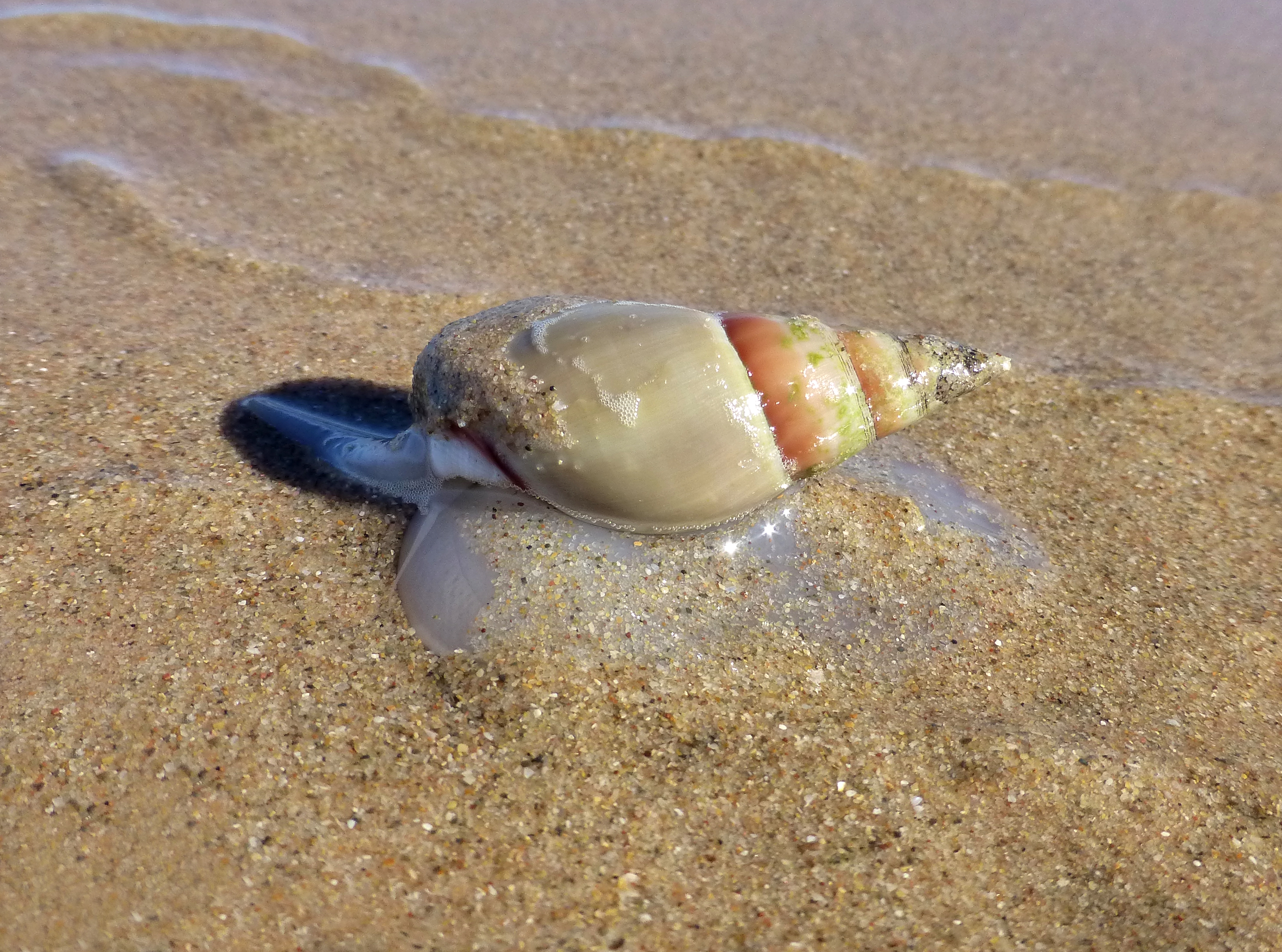

Scientific classification
- Kingdom: Animalia
- Phylum: Mollusca
- Class: Gastropoda
- Subclass: Caenogastropoda
- Order: Neogastropoda
- Family: Nassariidae
- Genus: Bullia
- Species: B. digitalis

Binomial name
- Bullia digitalis (Dillwyn, 1817)

Synonyms
- Buccinum achatinum Lamarck, 1816; Buccinum digitale Dillwyn, 1817 (original combination); Buccinum elongatulum Anton, 1838; Bullia (Bullia) digitalis (Dillwyn, 1817) · accepted, alternate representation; Bullia achatina (Lamarck, 1816); Bullia almo Bartsch, 1915; Bullia capensis Euthyme, 1885; Bullia dulcis G. B. Sowerby III, 1921; Bullia semiflammea Reeve, 1846; Bullia semiusta Reeve, 1846; Bullia soluta Turton, 1932; Bullia sulcata Reeve, 1846; Leiodomus quoyii Swainson, 1840

= Bullia digitalis =

Species of gastropod

Bullia digitalis, the finger plough shell, plough snail or surfing snail, is a species of sea snail, a marine gastropod mollusk in the family Nassariidae, the Nassa mud snails or dog whelks.

These dominant scavengers are attracted by the scent of decaying animal matter from a considerable distance so that they converge from all directions to feed.

== Description ==
Length: 60 mm

Narrow, smooth shell with a long, pointed spire, usually light yellow or creamy, often tinged with violet or yellow. The large, oval foot is offwhite. The operculum has serrated margins.

Movement of the Bullia digitalis

The ovate shell is elongated, subturreted, smooth and polished. It is of a reddish yellow color. The shell is composed of seven whorls, hardly convex. The suture which separates them is simple, shallow and submargined. The apex is moderately pointed. Pretty prominent striae of growth are seen upon the lowest whorl. The ovate aperture is smooth, widened at the middle and strongly emarginated at its base. The columella is yellowish, smooth and arched. A keel continues from the upper third of the aperture to the base of the outer lip. The space between the keel and the edge of the lip is filled with oblique folds. The outer lip is simple, thin, sharp, and slightly effuse towards the middle.

== Distribution ==
Lower east, south, south-west and west coast of South Africa. Best viewing: Kei Mouth.

Plough snails eating a stranded bluebottle

== Status ==
Common to locally very common; the dominant plough shell on Atlantic shores.

== Habitat ==
Sandy beaches along the surf zone, low on the shore from middle tidal zone seawards where the sand is not too coarse.

== Behaviour ==
When the tide starts to rise, this snail emerges from the sand, spreads its large "foot" like a sail, and surfs up the beach in response to the smell of carrion. The large foot is also used to burrow into the sand when the tide recedes. Sticks its proboscis into the prey to suck up soft tissues. Often gathers in large numbers to feed on dead and stranded jellyfish and bluebottles.

== Similar species ==
Various plough shells on the southern African coast look similar, including Bullia rhodostoma on the south coast and Bullia natalensis (pleated plough shell) on the coast of KwaZulu-Natal. B. digitalis however does not have pleated whorls like the pleated plough shell. All the common plough shells on the coast can only de differentiated for each other by their colour.

== See also ==
- Bullia natalensis
- Bullia rhodostoma
