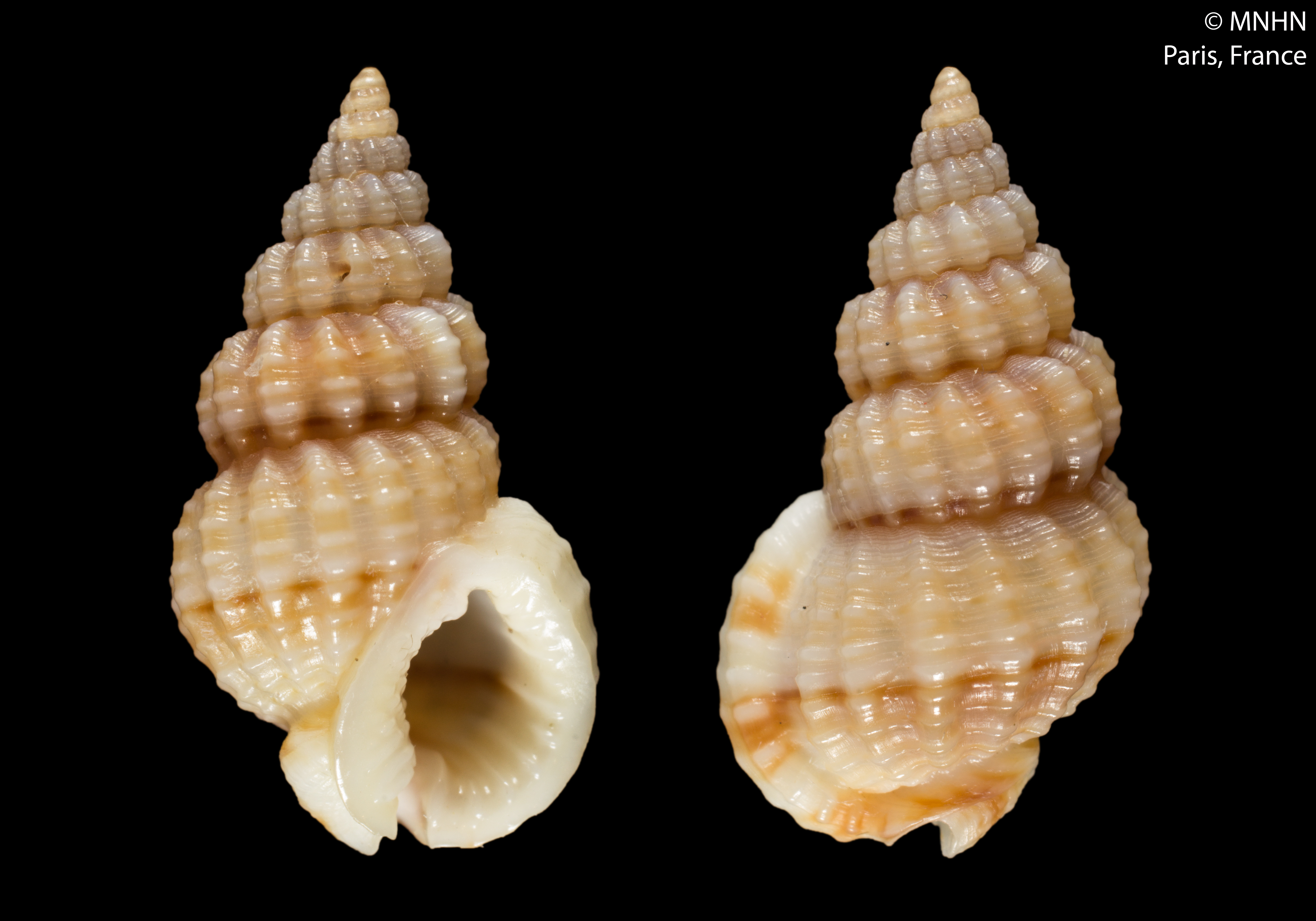
- Shell of Naytia priscardi (holotype at MNHN, Paris)

Scientific classification
- Kingdom: Animalia
- Phylum: Mollusca
- Class: Gastropoda
- Subclass: Caenogastropoda
- Order: Neogastropoda
- Superfamily: Buccinoidea
- Family: Nassariidae
- Genus: Naytia
- Species: N. priscardi

Binomial name
- Naytia priscardi Bozzetti, 2006

Synonyms
- Nassarius (Hima) priscardi Bozzetti, 2006; Nassarius priscardi Bozzetti, 2006

= Naytia priscardi =

Species of gastropod

Nassarius priscardi is a species of sea snail, a marine gastropod mollusk in the family Nassariidae, the Nassa mud snails or dog whelks.

== Description ==
The shell grows to a length of 16 mm.

== Distribution ==
This species occurs in the Indian Ocean off Madagascar.
