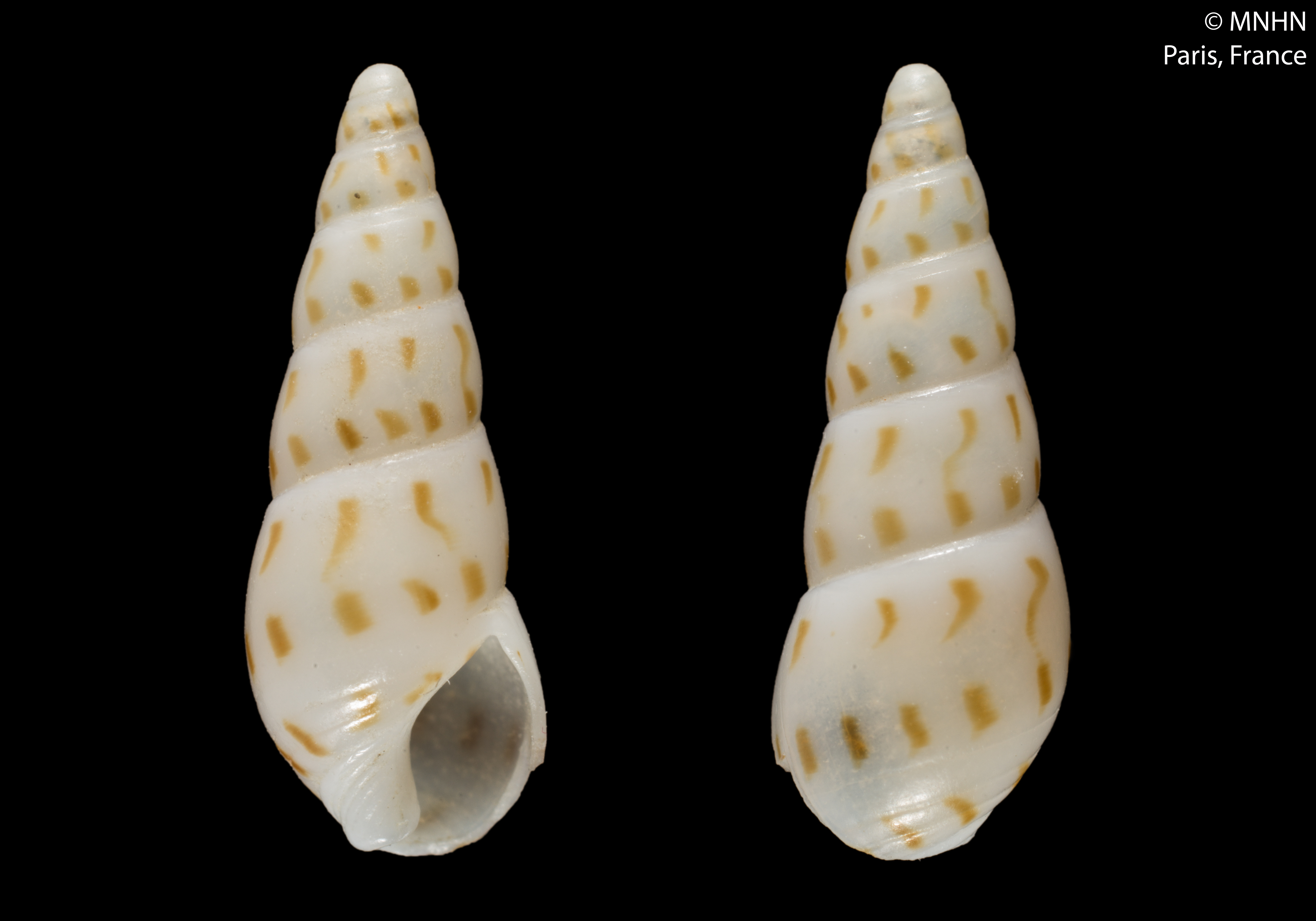
- Shell of Bullia mirepicta (holotype at MNHN, Paris)

Scientific classification
- Kingdom: Animalia
- Phylum: Mollusca
- Class: Gastropoda
- Subclass: Caenogastropoda
- Order: Neogastropoda
- Family: Nassariidae
- Genus: Bullia
- Species: B. mirepicta

Binomial name
- Bullia mirepicta Bozzetti, 2007

= Bullia mirepicta =

Species of gastropod

Bullia mirepicta is a species of sea snail, a marine gastropod mollusc in the family Nassariidae, the Nassa mud snails or dog whelks.

== Distribution ==
This marine species occurs off Madagascar.
