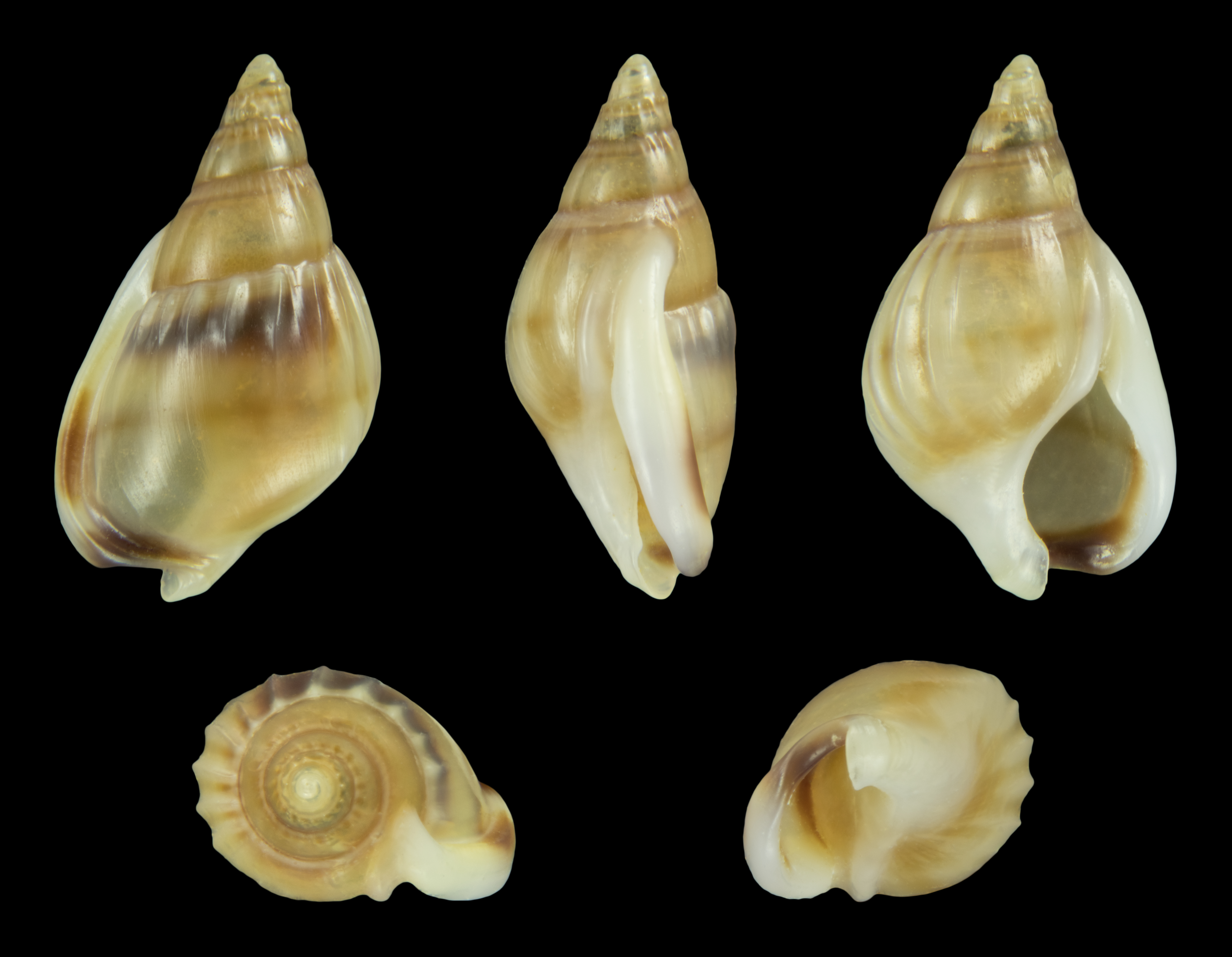

Scientific classification
- Kingdom: Animalia
- Phylum: Mollusca
- Class: Gastropoda
- Subclass: Caenogastropoda
- Order: Neogastropoda
- Family: Nassariidae
- Genus: Naytia
- Species: N. glabrata

Binomial name
- Naytia glabrata (G.B. Sowerby II, 1842)

Synonyms
- Buccinum obliquum Kiener, 1841; Nassa (Naytia) glabrata (G.B. Sowerby, 1842); Nassarius glabratus (G. B. Sowerby II, 1842); Nassarius (Nassarius) glabratus (G.B. Sowerby II, 1842); Nassarius obliquus (Kiener, 1835); Strombus glabratus G.B. Sowerby II, 1842 (original combination)

= Naytia glabrata =

Species of gastropod

Naytia glabrata is a species of sea snail, a marine gastropod mollusc in the family Nassariidae, the Nassa mud snails or dog whelks.

== Description ==
The shell size varies between 7 mm and 10 mm.

== Distribution ==
This species is distributed in the Atlantic Ocean off Senegal, Gabon, and Angola.
