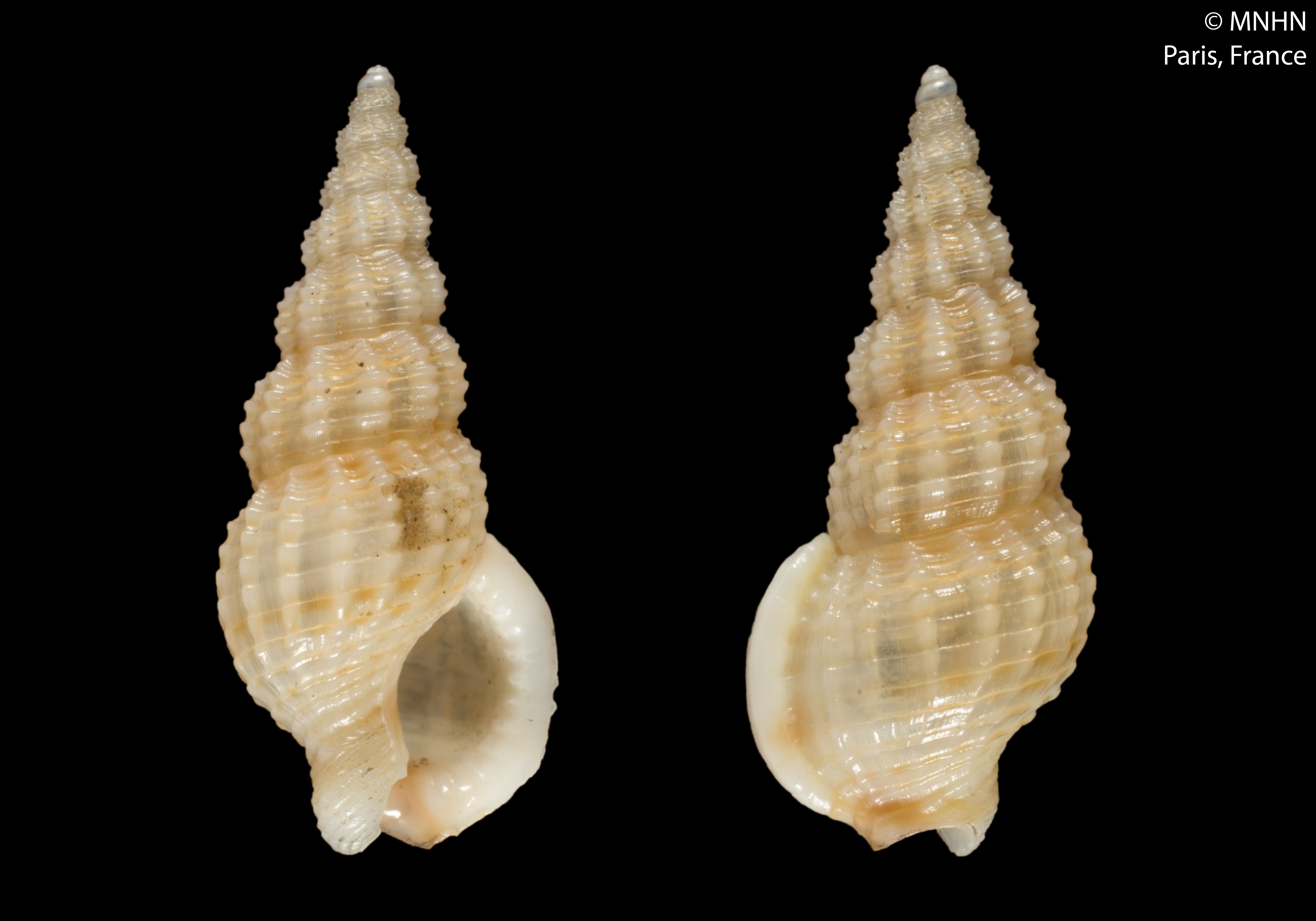
- Shell of Naytia vaucheri (lectotype at MNHN, Paris)

Scientific classification
- Kingdom: Animalia
- Phylum: Mollusca
- Class: Gastropoda
- Subclass: Caenogastropoda
- Order: Neogastropoda
- Family: Nassariidae
- Genus: Naytia
- Species: N. vaucheri

Binomial name
- Naytia vaucheri (Pallary, 1906)

Synonyms
- Nassa (Hnnia) vaucheri Pallary 1906 (basionym); Nassa vaucheri var. minor Pallary 1920; Nassarius (Nassarius) vaucheri (Pallary, 1906); Tritia vaucheri (Pallary, 1906) superseded combination

= Naytia vaucheri =

Species of gastropod

Naytia vaucheri is a species of sea snail, a marine gastropod mollusc in the family Nassariidae, the nassa mud snails or dog whelks.

== Description ==
The shell grows to a length of 12 mm, its diameter 4.5 mm.

(Original description in Latin) The shell appears shiny and translucent. The spire is elevated and lurid. There are 8.5 whorls; the apical 1.5 are smooth. The 7 normal whorls are rounded, separated by an impressed suture (the body whorl exceeds half of the total length, 6/11), and are provided with crowded growth lines, only visible under a lens. They are adorned with numerous longitudinal ribs and filiform decurrent cords (12 on the body whorl, 6 on the penultimate whorl). The longitudinal ribs are somewhat flexuous, narrower than the interspaces, and attenuate near the tail on the body whorl. Where the ribs and cords meet, they are regularly dissected into tubercles.

The aperture is oval, angled at the top, and rounded at the bottom. The columella is arched and scarcely plicate. The tail is quite long, adorned with crowded decurrent folds, and slightly incised posteriorly. The siphonal canal is open, oblique, and somewhat broad. The columellar callus is scarcely conspicuous. Externally, it is broadly and thickly margined, while internally, it is nine or ten-dentate.

The color of the whorls is shiny and tawny, the outer lip is whitish. A red band, only manifest in the interspaces of the ribs, encircles the whorl above the suture and extends to the outer lip. The base is depicted in the same manner with decurrent cords. A reddish spot extends above the tail near the outer lip. The operculum is horny, round-oval, terminating in a point below, and scarcely or not dentate on the outer margin.

== Distribution ==
This species occurs in the Alboran Sea, Western Mediterranean Sea.
