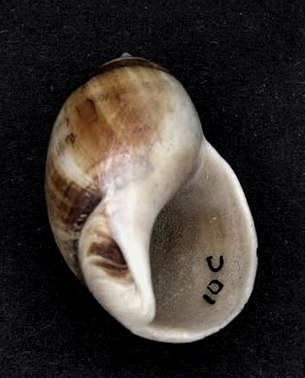
- Apertural view of a shell of Bullia laevissima (museum specimen at Naturalis Biodiversity Center)

Scientific classification
- Kingdom: Animalia
- Phylum: Mollusca
- Class: Gastropoda
- Subclass: Caenogastropoda
- Order: Neogastropoda
- Family: Nassariidae
- Genus: Bullia
- Species: B. laevissima

Binomial name
- Bullia laevissima (Gmelin, 1791)

Synonyms
- Buccinum laevigatum Lamarck, 1816; Buccinum laevissimum Gmelin, 1791 (original combination); Bullia (Bullia) laevissima (Gmelin, 1791); Bullia sowerbyi Turton, 1932

= Bullia laevissima =

Species of gastropod

Bullia laevissima, common name the fat plough shell, is a species of sea snail, a marine gastropod mollusk in the family Nassariidae, the Nassa mud snails or dog whelks.

== Description ==
The length of the shell varies between 35 mm and 67 mm.

The smooth shell is ovate, oblong and ventricose. Its ground color is whitish with some slightly apparent, transverse-brown bands. The epidermis is reddish brown. The convex longitudinal folds are formed by the growth of the shell. The short spire is obtuse with sutures slightly apparent. The smooth aperture is oblong and wide, narrowed at the upper part, somewhat more dilated at its base, where it is terminated by an oblique, wide emargination. The outer lip is thin, rounded, colored internally of a fawn color. Externally, near the base, is observed a prominent fold, which is continued winding round as far as the inferior third of the columella. This is arcuated, and slightly oblique.

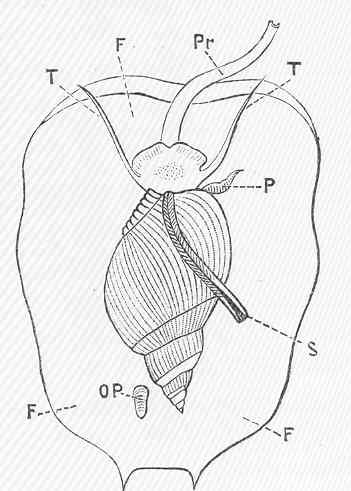
Bullia laevissima Gmel, showing branchial siphon S; F,F,F, foot; OP, operculum; P, penis; Pr proboscis; T, T, tentacles

According to the observations of Quoy and Gaimard, the animal of this species is blind; and what renders it particularly remarkable, is a very large foot, extending from all parts of the shell. The operculum is exceedingly small. This mollusk possesses the power of absorbing by its foot, by means of pores with which this part is provided, a large quantity of water, which it throws off again, when it is disturbed, in several directions. It lives in deep water, and when it is brought towards the shore, its foot still farther enables it to bury itself in the sand. It is very voracious : it is generally taken, by placing a piece of flesh, as bait, in a net.

== Distribution ==
This marine species occurs off Namibia to South Transkei, South Africa
