= Bullia pura =

Scientific classification
- Kingdom: Animalia
- Phylum: Mollusca
- Class: Gastropoda
- Subclass: Caenogastropoda
- Order: Neogastropoda
- Family: Nassariidae
- Genus: Bullia
- Species: B. pura

Binomial name
- Bullia pura Melvill, 1885

Species of gastropod

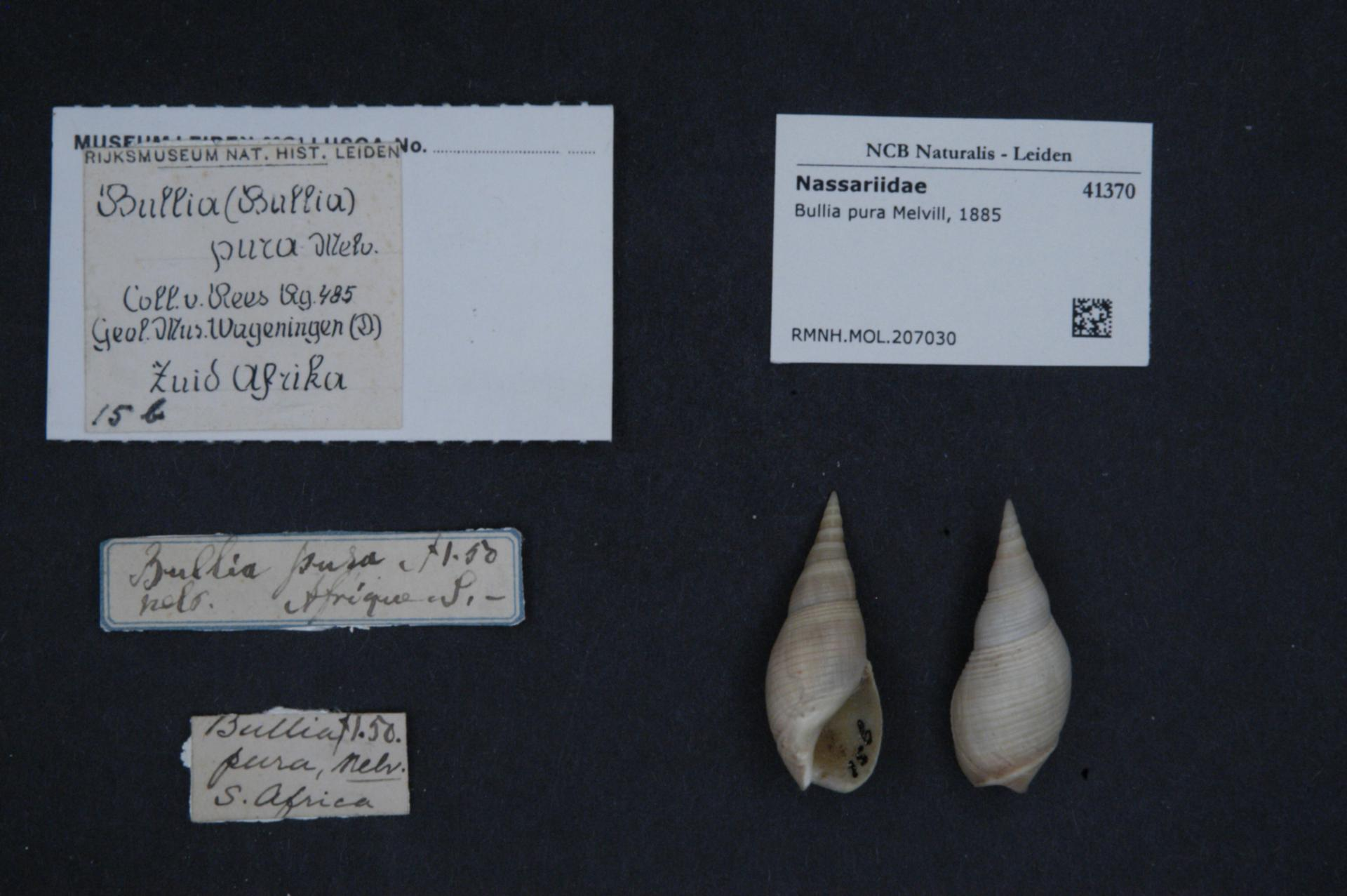
Bullia pura Melvill

Bullia pura, common name the pure plough shell, is a species of sea snail, a marine gastropod mollusk in the family Nassariidae, the Nassa mud snails or dog whelks.
