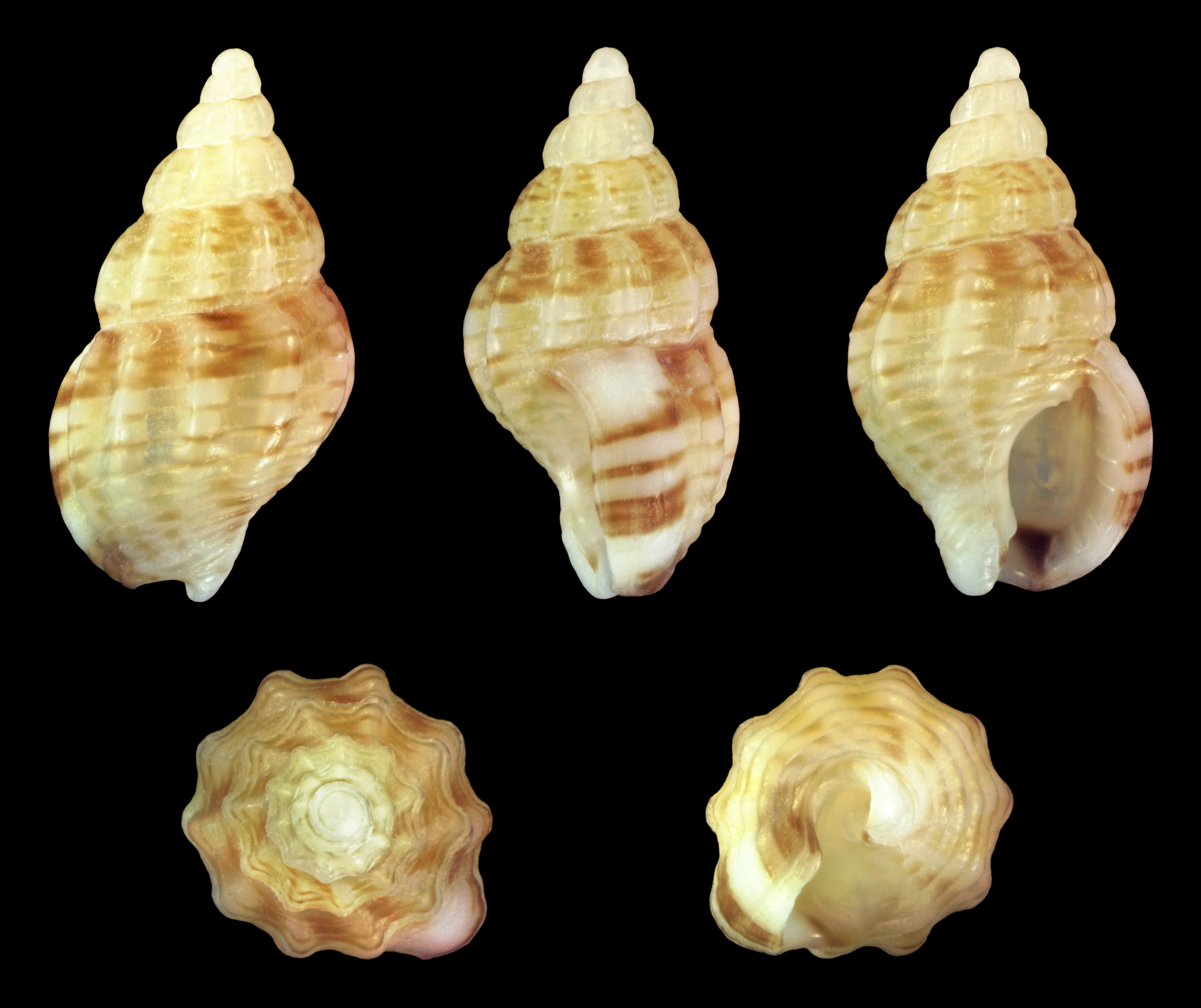

Scientific classification
- Kingdom: Animalia
- Phylum: Mollusca
- Class: Gastropoda
- Subclass: Caenogastropoda
- Order: Neogastropoda
- Family: Nassariidae
- Genus: Naytia
- Species: N. johni

Binomial name
- Naytia johni (Monterosato, 1889)

Synonyms
- Nassa johni Monterosato, 1889; Nassa johni var. dakarensis Fischer-Piette & Nickles, 1946; Nassarius johni (Monterosato, 1889); Nassarius (Aciculina) johni (Monterosato, 1889)

= Naytia johni =

Species of gastropod

Nassarius johni is a species of sea snail, a marine gastropod mollusk in the family Nassariidae, the Nassa mud snails or dog whelks.

== Description ==
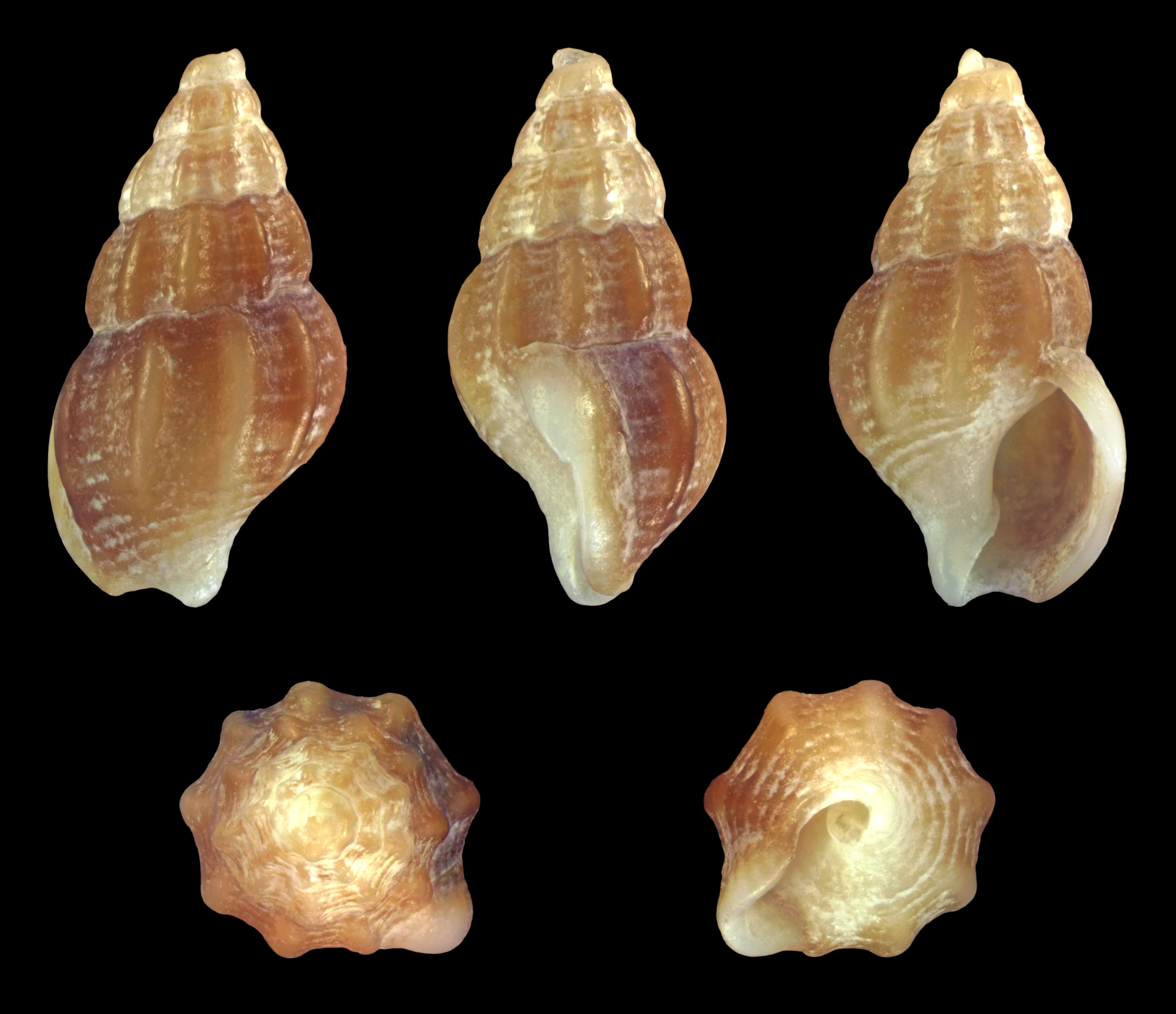
var. dakarensis

The length of the shell varies between 4 mm and 8 mm.

== Distribution ==
This species occurs in the Alboran Sea, off Morocco.
