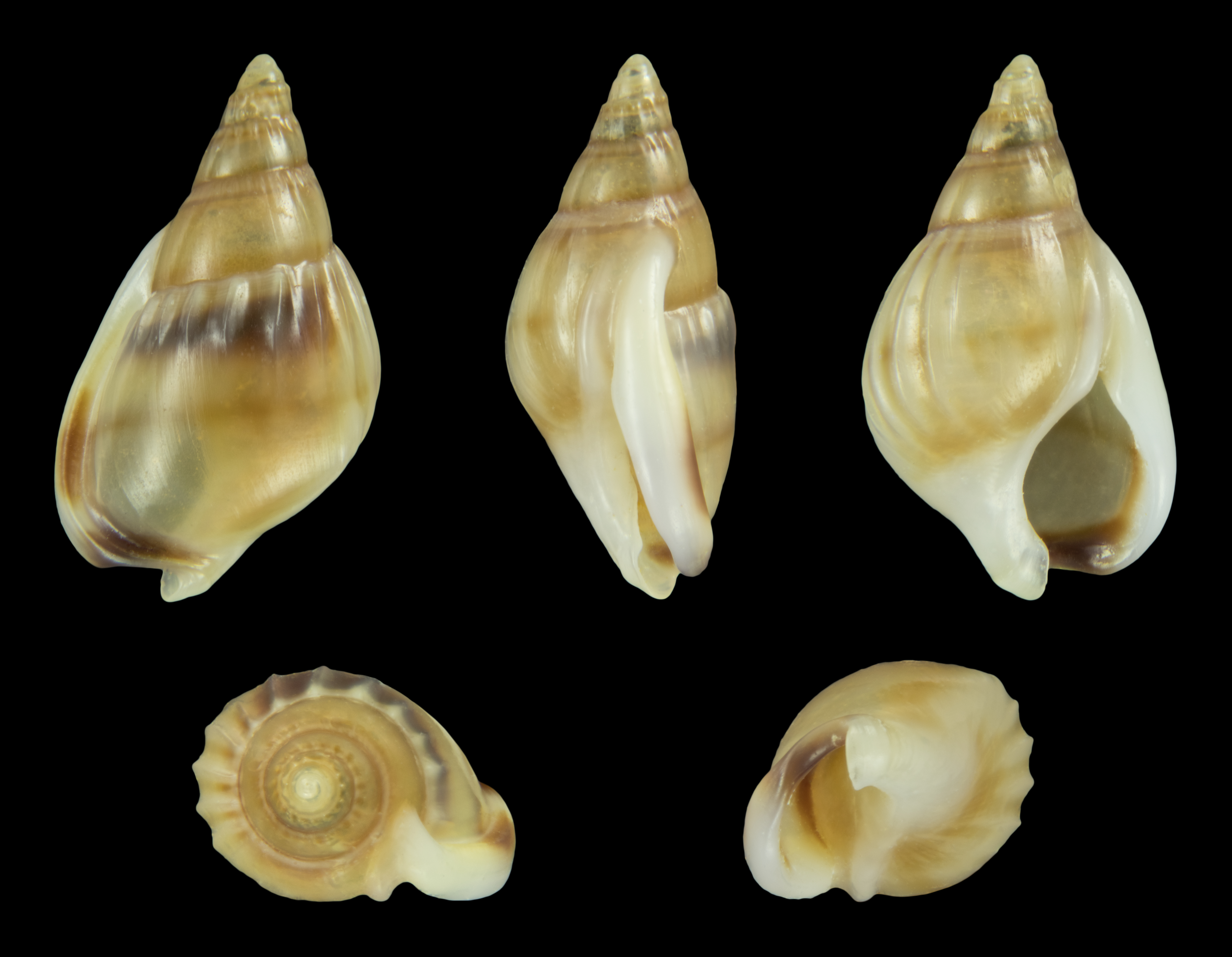
- Shell of Naytia glabrata

Scientific classification
- Kingdom: Animalia
- Phylum: Mollusca
- Class: Gastropoda
- Subclass: Caenogastropoda
- Order: Neogastropoda
- Superfamily: Buccinoidea
- Family: Nassariidae
- Genus: Naytia; H. Adams & A. Adams, 1853

Type species
- Strombus glabratus G. B. Sowerby II, 1842

Synonyms
- Dorsanum (Fluviodorsum) Boettger, 1885; Nassa (Naytia) H. Adams & A. Adams, 1853; Nassarius (Naytia) H. Adams & A. Adams, 1853

= Naytia =

Genus of gastropods

Naytia is a genus of brackish water snails, gastropod mollusks in the subfamily Nassariinae of the family Nassariidae.

== Description ==
The shell is smooth. The aperture has a channel at the hind part continued up the spire.

== Species ==
Species within the genus Naytia include:

- Naytia glabrata (G. B. Sowerby II, 1842)
- Naytia granulosa (Lamarck, 1822)
- Naytia inopinata Nolf & Hubrecht, 2024
- Naytia johni (Monterosato, 1889)
- Naytia priscardi Bozzetti, 2006
- Naytia vaucheri (Pallary, 1906)
