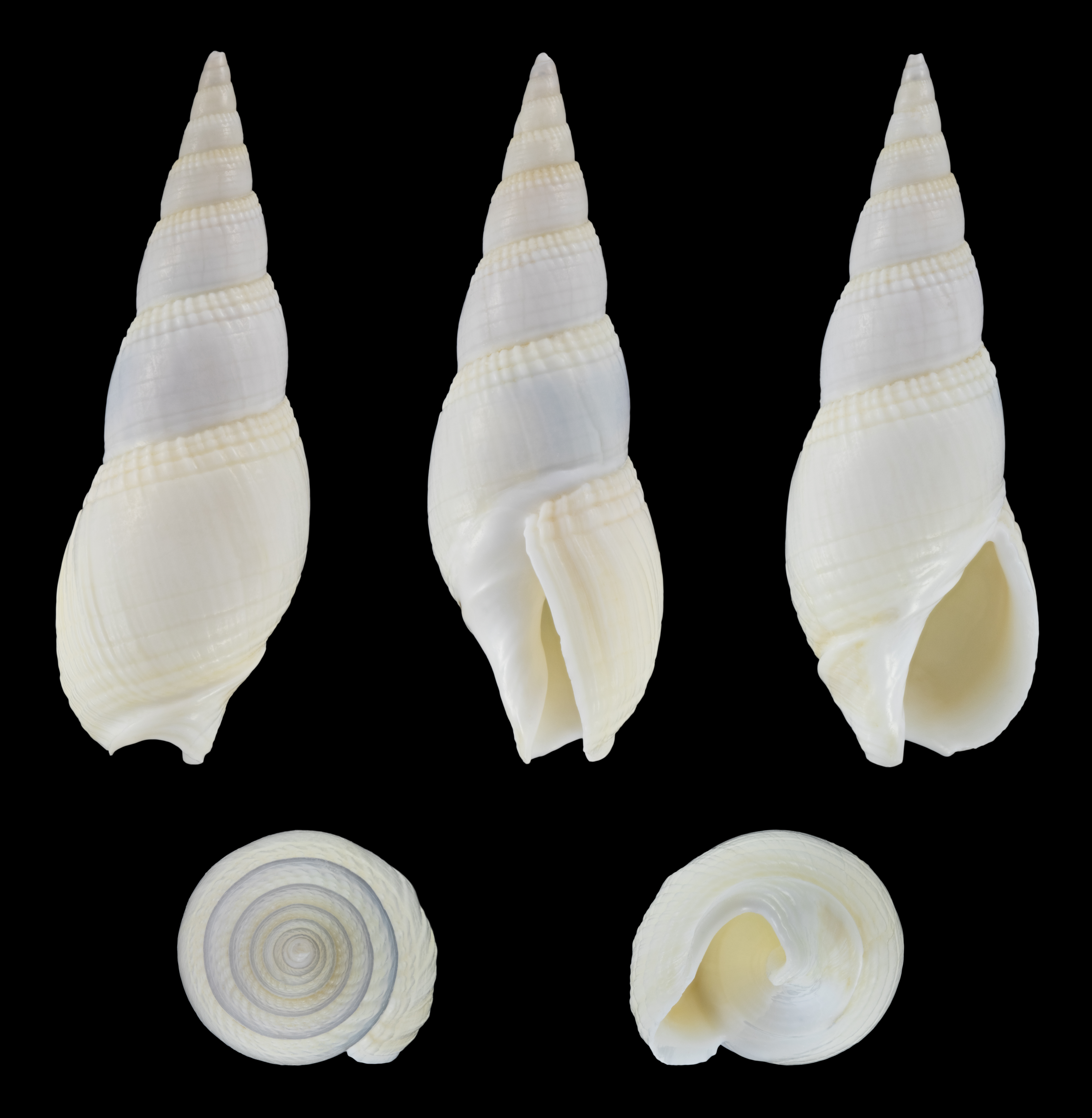
- A shell of Bullia vittata

Scientific classification
- Kingdom: Animalia
- Phylum: Mollusca
- Class: Gastropoda
- Subclass: Caenogastropoda
- Order: Neogastropoda
- Family: Nassariidae
- Genus: Bullia
- Species: B. vittata

Binomial name
- Bullia vittata (Linnaeus, 1767)

Synonyms
- Ancilla alba Perry, 1811; Buccinanops vittatus (Linnaeus, 1767); Buccinum vittatum Linnaeus, 1767 (original combination); Eburna monilis Schumacher, 1817; Terebra buccinoidea Blainville, 1824

= Bullia vittata =

Species of gastropod

Bullia vittata, common name the ribbon bullia, is a species of sea snail, a marine gastropod mollusk in the family Nassariidae, the Nassa mud snails or dog whelks.

== Description ==
The shell size varies between 27 mm and 50 mm

The elongated shell is conical, and slightly turreted. It is of a bluish or ashy white color. The spire is very pointed at its summit. It is composed of nine or ten slightly convex whorls, united by a shallow suture, and furnished at their upper part with very close small folds or granulations. These folds form a girdle, and crown the whorls, which are again ornamented throughout their whole length with transverse thin ridges, more strongly prominent towards the base. There appear, besides, upon the body whorl, oblique striae of growth pretty apparent, and presenting sometimes the appearance of varices. One or two striae separate also the folds from the upper marginal edge. The aperture is oblong, slightly narrowed, dilated at its base, where it is terminated by a very deep and slightly oblique emargination. The interior of the aperture is of a brown fawn color. The outer lip is white, thin and sharp. The columella is white and rounded.

== Distribution ==
This species is found off South Africa and Western Australia.
