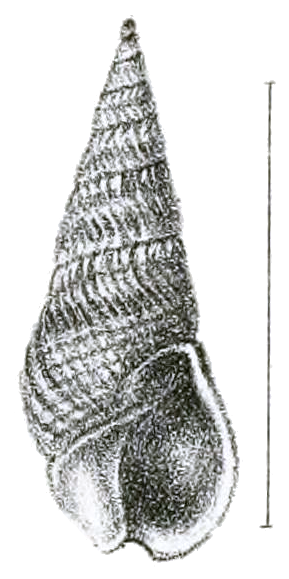
- Black and white drawing of an apertural view of a shell of Bullia mozambicensis. The scale bar is probably 1 inch.

Scientific classification
- Kingdom: Animalia
- Phylum: Mollusca
- Class: Gastropoda
- Subclass: Caenogastropoda
- Order: Neogastropoda
- Family: Nassariidae
- Genus: Bullia
- Species: B. mozambicensis

Binomial name
- Bullia mozambicensis E. A. Smith, 1877

Synonyms
- Bullia pustulosa Sowerby, 1894

= Bullia mozambicensis =

Species of gastropod

Bullia mozambicensis is a species of sea snail, a marine gastropod mollusk in the family Nassariidae, the Nassa mud snails or dog whelks.

== Distribution ==
Distribution of Bullia mozambicensis includes:

- Mozambique
- South Coast of South Africa and Natal

The type locality is mouth of the Macusi River, Quelimane, Mozambique.

== Description ==
Bullia mozambicensis was originally discovered and described by British malacologist Edgar Albert Smith in 1877. Smith's original text (the type description) reads as follows:

Shell elongate, acuminately spired, more or less livid in colour; whorls nine, the two apical ones smooth and shining, the rest but slightly convex, separated by an oblique suture, sculptured with oblique, somewhat flexuous, fine and close-set plicae, which extend from suture to suture in the upper whorls, and gradually become obsolete about the middle of the last volution; these riblets or plications, which are about equal in thickness to the spaces between them, give the upper margins of the whorls a finely crenulated appearance, and are subgranulous, through being intersected by spiral striae, which gradually become wider apart as the shell increases; they are about nine in number on the penultimate whorl; the last is encircled by about 13; and the keel which winds around its base is of a brown colour, and the portion of the whorl below it whitish; mouth ovate-acuminate above, occupying a little more than 3/8 of the entire length of the shell, olive-brown or purplish-brown margined with white within the labrum and at the base; labrum thickened, acute at the edge, and inconspicuously sinuated above; columella arcuate in the middle, thinly coated with a white enamel, which, extending above the lip and winding along the suture, gradually vanishes as it proceeds up the spire.

Length 32 millims.; diam. of last whorl 11; length of mouth 12½, width nearly 6. Operculum unguiculate, concentrically and transversely striated.

Hab. Mouth of the Macusi River, Quilimane, E. Africa.

This species is remarkable for the subgranose plications on the whorls, and the brown carina of the body-whorl. It is difficult to describe in a few words the colour of this interesting form. The general appearance is livid, inclining to yellow or very pale olive; one shell is livid, with the upper margin of the whorls reddish. The callous band is quite conspicuous only about halfway around the body-whorl, and then gradually fades away, and is only noticeable further up the spire by slightly obliterating the lower extremities of the longitudinal ribs.

Two not quite adult specimens were collected by Dr. Kirk at the delta of the Zambesi River, and were placed in the British Museum

by Earl Russell.
