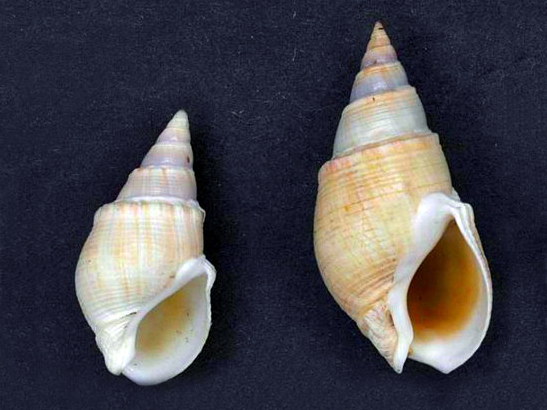
- Two shells of Bullia annulata (museum specimens at Naturalis Biodiversity Center)

Scientific classification
- Kingdom: Animalia
- Phylum: Mollusca
- Class: Gastropoda
- Subclass: Caenogastropoda
- Order: Neogastropoda
- Family: Nassariidae
- Genus: Bullia
- Species: B. annulata

Binomial name
- Bullia annulata (Lamarck, 1816)

Synonyms
- Buccinum annulatum Lamarck, 1816 (original combination); Bullia (Bullia) annulata (Lamarck, 1816) · accepted, alternate representation

= Bullia annulata =

Species of gastropod

Bullia annulata, common name the annulated plough shell or annulate bullia, is a species of sea snail, a marine gastropod mollusk in the family Nassariidae, the Nassa mud snails or dog whelks.

== Description ==
The length of the shell varies between 35 mm and 60 mm.

The ovate, conical shell is transversely striated. It is of a reddish white color. The pointed spire is, composed of nine angular whorls, depressed at their upper part, where they are surrounded by a sort of wrinkled ring. The whorls of the spire, with the exception of the last, are by no means convex. The whitish aperture is ovate and emarginated at its base. The thin outer lip is sharp, forming a small canal at its upper and internal part at its union with the left lip. The columella is white.

This species is remarkable for its pointed spire, and its angular whorls, the upper ones having their margin slightly scaly.

== Distribution ==
This marine species occurs off Saldanha Bay, South Africa; and off Mozambique
