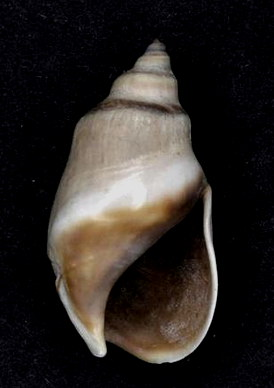
- Apertural view of a shell of Bullia callosa (museum specimen at Naturalis Biodiversity Center)

Scientific classification
- Kingdom: Animalia
- Phylum: Mollusca
- Class: Gastropoda
- Subclass: Caenogastropoda
- Order: Neogastropoda
- Family: Nassariidae
- Genus: Bullia
- Species: B. callosa

Binomial name
- Bullia callosa (W. Wood, 1828)

Synonyms
- Buccinum callosum W. Wood, 1828 (original combination); Bullia (Bullia) callosa (Wood, 1828) · accepted, alternate representation; Bullia callosa var. sulcata G.B. Sowerby III, 1889

= Bullia callosa =

Species of gastropod

Bullia callosa, common name the callused bullia, is a species of sea snail, a marine gastropod mollusk in the family Nassariidae, the Nassa mud snails or dog whelks.

== Description ==
The length of the shell varies between 18 mm and 50 mm.

The shell is elongated and cylindrical. The whole external surface is smooth, shining, of a coffee and milk color. The elongated spire is pointed. It is composed of six not convex whorls. Each whorl is covered between the sutures with a layer of matter, which assumes at the base a chestnut color. This layer is much thicker upon the body whorl, and is continued, enlarging itself, to the left lip, where it forms a large semicircular callosity, of a deep chestnut color, bordered with white. Each of the whorls of the spire is likewise separated from the others by a fawn-colored line, which is delineated a little below each suture. The aperture is ovate, of a pale fawn-color, dilated towards the middle, strongly emarginated at its base. The columella is arcuated, callous, fawn-colored and smooth. The callosity of the columella is oblique, thick, furrowed, much shorter than the outer lip. From its lower part, a stria stretches out, which is directed obliquely upon the back of the shell, to its termination at the anterior angle of the right lip, which is sharp.

== Distribution ==
This marine species occurs from Angola to Mozambique.
