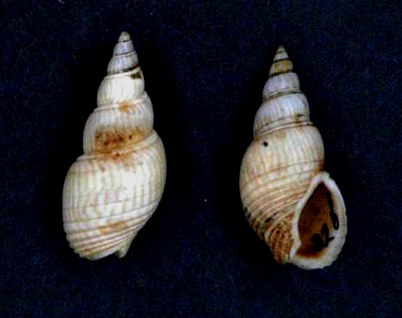
- Two views of a shell of Bullia tranquebarica (museum specimens at Naturalis Biodiversity Center)

Scientific classification
- Kingdom: Animalia
- Phylum: Mollusca
- Class: Gastropoda
- Subclass: Caenogastropoda
- Order: Neogastropoda
- Family: Nassariidae
- Genus: Bullia
- Species: B. tranquebarica

Binomial name
- Bullia tranquebarica (Röding, 1798)

Synonyms
- Buccinum bellangeri Kiener, 1834; Bullia (Bullia) tranquebarica (Röding, 1798) · accepted, alternate representation; Bullia bellangeri (Kiener, 1834); Dorsanum belangeri (Kiener, 1834); Plotia tranquebarica Röding, 1798 (original combination); Terebra lineoloata G. B. Sowerby I, 1825

= Bullia tranquebarica =

Species of gastropod

Bullia tranquebarica, common name the lined bullia, is a species of sea snail, a marine gastropod mollusk in the family Nassariidae, the Nassa mud snails or dog whelks.

== Description ==
The shell grows to a length of 35 mm.

The narrow shell is elongated and subturreted. It is of a bright, transparent ash color, covered with longitudinal waved and reddish lines. The elongated spire is composed of seven or eight slightly convex whorls. They are marked at their upper part by a marginated suture, and two slightly apparent striae towards the base. The body whorl is shorter than the spire, marked at its base with regular, transverse striae or ridges. The oval aperture is oblong, smooth and white. The outer lip is thin and sharp, slightly plaited internally. The columella, slightly arcuated, is terminated by a pretty prominent oblique fold.

== Distribution ==
This species occurs in the Indian Ocean off Madagascar.
