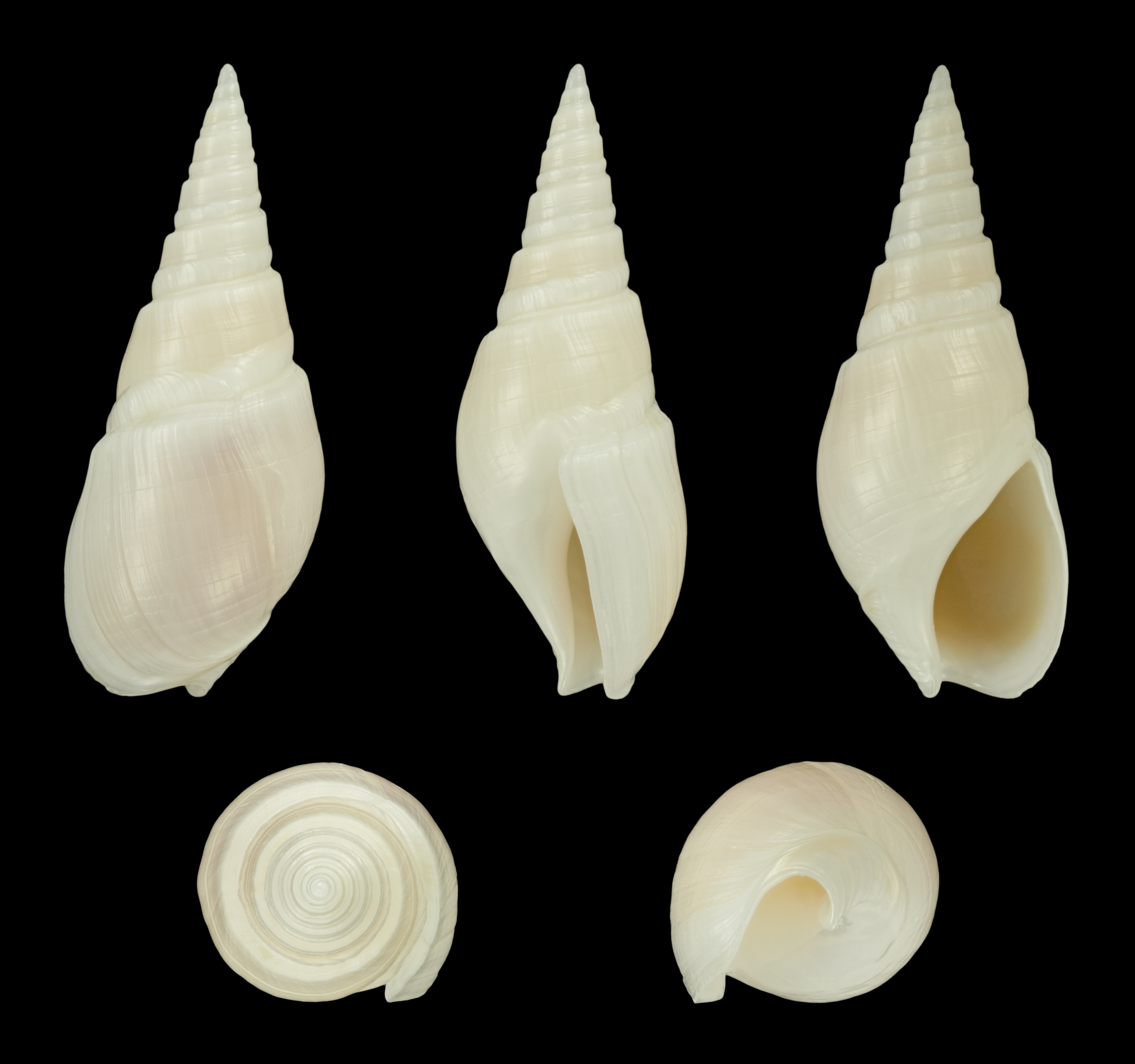

Scientific classification
- Kingdom: Animalia
- Phylum: Mollusca
- Class: Gastropoda
- Subclass: Caenogastropoda
- Order: Neogastropoda
- Family: Nassariidae
- Genus: Bullia
- Species: B. mauritiana

Binomial name
- Bullia mauritiana (Gray, 1839)

Synonyms
- Bullia grayi Reeve, L.A., 1846; Dorsanum mauritianum (Gray, 1839)

= Bullia mauritiana =

Species of gastropod

Bullia mauritiana, the Mauritius bullia, is a species of sea snail, a marine gastropod mollusk in the family Nassariidae, the Nassa mud snails or dog whelks.

== Description ==
=== Exterior Shell and Structure ===
The shell size varies between 30mm and 75mm. The shell's base color varies from cream colored to sandy yellow or tan. B. mauritiana has axial bands that are slightly lighter in color than the base color of the shell. The shell has a fusiform shape with a conical spire and a rounded body whorl. The shell has 6-8 whorls. The whorls of the spire are straight sided with prominently shouldered sutures between whorls, the spire culminates in a pointed apex at the protoconch. The sculpture of B. mauritiana has spiral striae, lightly impressed on the body whorl. In some specimens, beginning on the whorls of the spire is a deeply impressed band nearest to the anterior end of each whorl and 2-3 more lightly impressed striae per whorl after the initial deeply impressed striae. The aperture is teardrop shaped, narrowing towards the anal sulcus.

== Distribution and Habitat ==
This species is distributed in the Indian Ocean along Madagascar and South Africa. B. mauritiana is a marine benthic snail that is found primarily on sandy shores.

== Life Habits ==
=== Diet ===
B. mauritiana is an opportunistic predator and scavenger. This species is carnivorous, and consumes live polychaetas and small crustaceans that share the snail's sandy shore habitat.

=== Locomotion ===
B. mauritiana moves by mucus mediated gliding. Other Bullia species have been observed utilizing their wide, muscular foot to propel themselves across sand. They also use this foot to dig and burrow into the sand.

=== Reproduction ===
B. mauritiana is a non-broadcast spawner and reproduces sexually.
