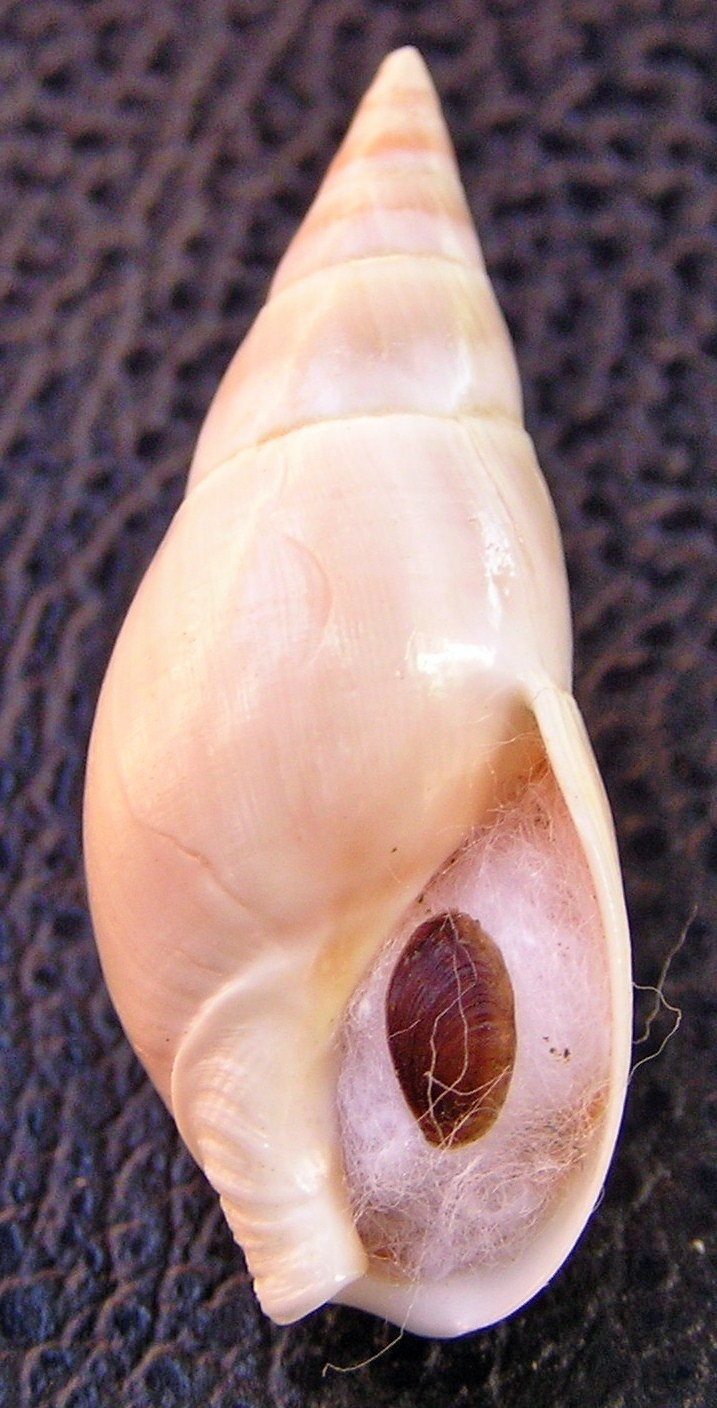
- Apertural view of a shell of Bullia rhodostoma

Scientific classification
- Kingdom: Animalia
- Phylum: Mollusca
- Class: Gastropoda
- Subclass: Caenogastropoda
- Order: Neogastropoda
- Family: Nassariidae
- Genus: Bullia
- Species: B. rhodostoma

Binomial name
- Bullia rhodostoma Reeve, 1847

Synonyms
- Bullia (Bullia) rhodostoma Reeve, 1847

= Bullia rhodostoma =

Species of gastropod

Bullia rhodostoma, common name the smooth plough shell, is a species of sea snail, a marine gastropod mollusk in the family Nassariidae, the nassa mud snails or dog whelks.

== Description ==
The length of the shell varies between 25 mm and 50 mm. Bullia rhodostoma are a slow growing, long-lived species with a life span of 15-20 years, following a 0.79 mortality rate, and 0.21 survival rate in their first 3 years. Successful adaptation has occurred because Bullia rhodostoma uses their single foot for crawling fast to search for food (usually stranded organisms, as they are carnivores), burying in the sand and surfing in the water on the shore.

== Distribution ==
This marine species occurs off South Africa.
