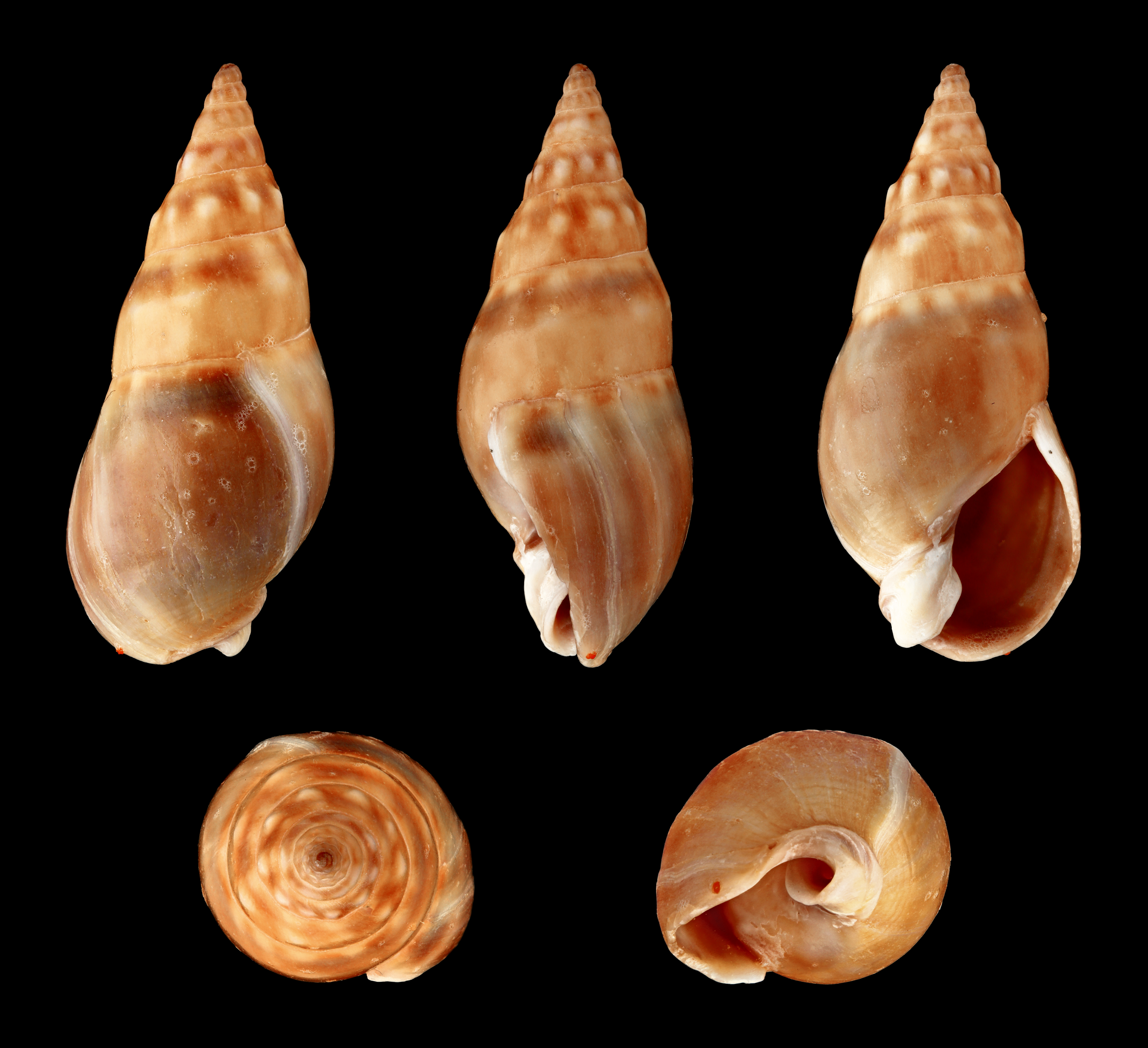
- Five views of a shell of Dorsanum miran (Bruguiere, 1799)

Scientific classification
- Kingdom: Animalia
- Phylum: Mollusca
- Class: Gastropoda
- Subclass: Caenogastropoda
- Order: Neogastropoda
- Family: Nassariidae
- Genus: Dorsanum
- Species: D. miran

Binomial name
- Dorsanum miran (Bruguière, 1789)

Synonyms
- Buccinum miran Bruguière, 1789 (original combination); Buccinum politum Lamarck, 1822; Bullia miran (Bruguière, 1789); Bullia vitrea Reeve, 1846; Dorsanum (Dorsanum) miran (Bruguière, 1789)

= Dorsanum miran =

Species of gastropod

Dorsanum miran, the Moroccan bullia, is a species of sea snail, a marine gastropod mollusc in the family Nassariidae, the nassa mud snails or dog whelks.

== Description ==
The shell size varies between 20 mm and 30 mm

The shell is ovate, conical, and very pointed at its summit. It is smooth, shining, and of a bluish white or yellow color. The elongated spire is formed of eight slightly convex whorls. The sutures are edged with a yellow border, and a little beneath with another violet band: These two zones are much more perceptible upon the lower whorl. The upper whorls are often longitudinally plaited. The epidermis is thin and greenish. The smooth aperture is yellowish. The columella is slightly elongated, twisted at its extremity, and provided outwardly, at its origin, with two keels. The first is continued as far as the edge of the right lip, and the second terminates at the emargination, which is very apparent. The outer lip is very thin, sharp and fragile.

== Distribution ==
This species occurs in the Atlantic Ocean off Morocco, Senegal and Angola.
