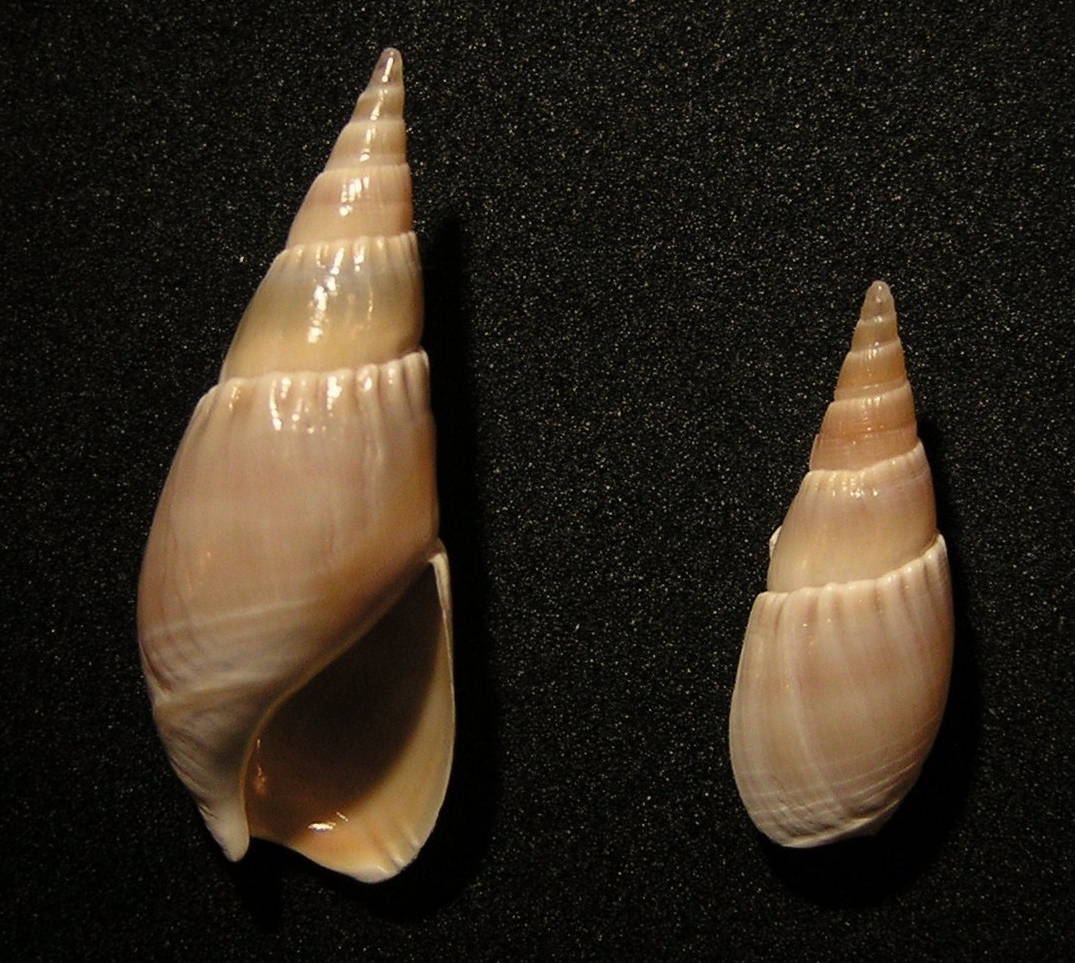
- Several views of a shell of Bullia natalensis

Scientific classification
- Kingdom: Animalia
- Phylum: Mollusca
- Class: Gastropoda
- Subclass: Caenogastropoda
- Order: Neogastropoda
- Family: Nassariidae
- Genus: Bullia
- Species: B. natalensis

Binomial name
- Bullia natalensis (Krauss, 1848)

Synonyms
- Buccinum natalense Krauss, 1848 (original combination); Bullia (Bullia) natalensis (Krauss, 1848); Bullia plicata Redfield, 1848

= Bullia natalensis =

Species of gastropod

Bullia natalensis, the pleated plough shell, is a species of sea snail, a marine gastropod mollusk in the family Nassariidae, the Nassa mud snails or dog whelks.

== Description ==
The length of the shell varies between 20 mm and 60 mm.

Their functional type is benthos.

Their feeding type is scavenger.

== Distribution ==
This species occurs off Mozambique and the East Coast of South Africa.
