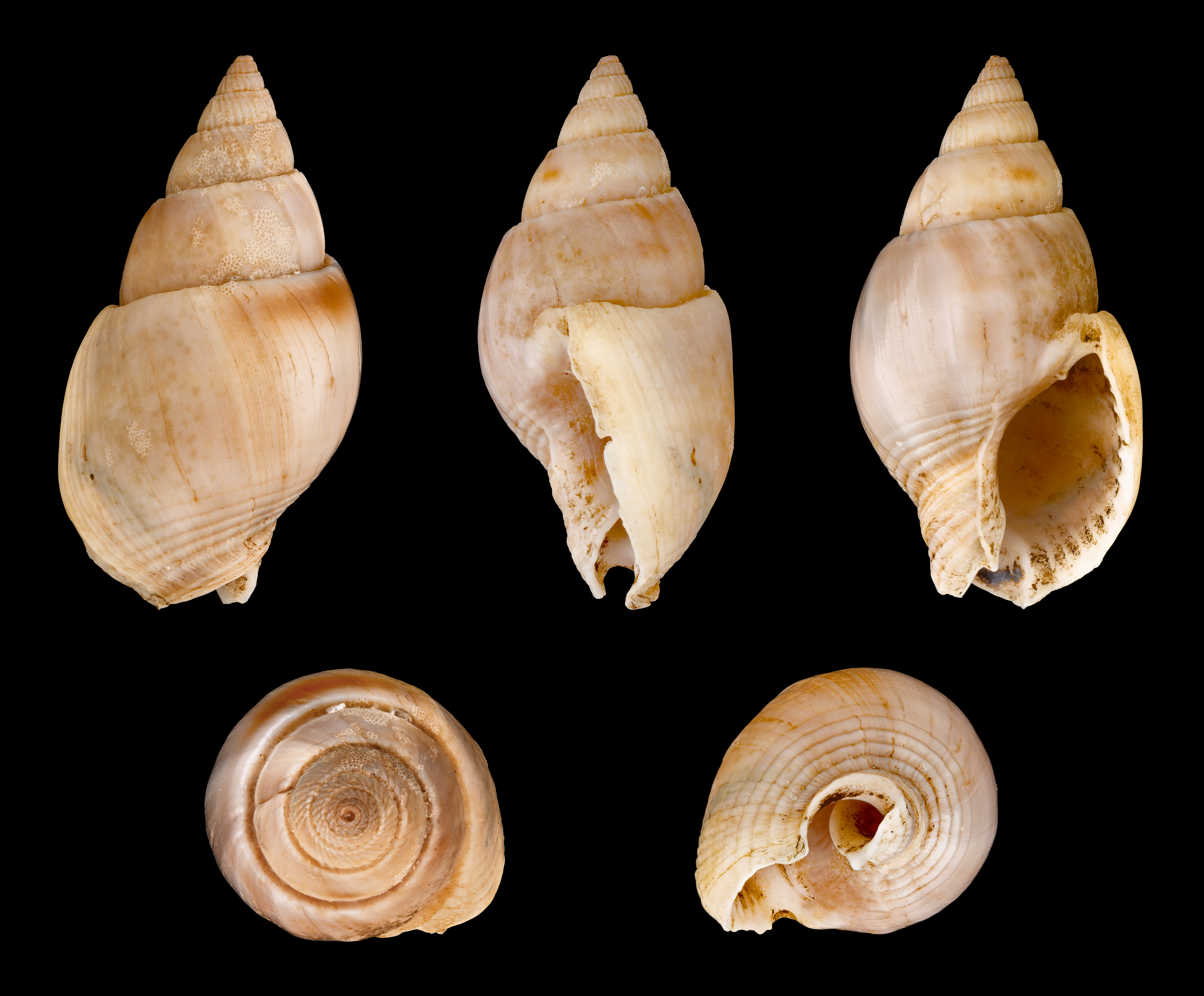

Scientific classification
- Kingdom: Animalia
- Phylum: Mollusca
- Class: Gastropoda
- Subclass: Caenogastropoda
- Order: Neogastropoda
- Family: Nassariidae
- Genus: Nassarius
- Species: N. dorsatus

Binomial name
- Nassarius dorsatus (Röding, 1798)

Synonyms
- Arcularia dorsata (Röding, 1798); Buccinum dorsatum Röding, 1798; Buccinum laeve sinuatum Chemnitz, 1780; Buccinum trifasciatum Gmelin, 1791; Buccinum unicolorum Kiener, 1834; Bullia cinerea Preston, 1906; Nassa (Alectrion) rutilans Reeve, 1853; Nassa dorsata (Röding, 1798); Nassa laevis Mörch, 1852; Nassa livida Gray in King, 1827; Nassa nitidula Marrat, 1880; Nassa rutilans Reeve, 1853; Nassa trifasciata (Gmelin, 1791); Nassa unicolor E. A. Smith, 1884; Nassa unicolorata Reeve, 1853; Nassarius (Zeuxis) dorsatus (Röding, 1798) · accepted, alternate representation; Tarazeuxis unicolorus (Kiener, 1834); Zeuxis dorsatus (Röding, 1798)

= Nassarius dorsatus =

Species of gastropod

Nassarius dorsatus, common name the channeled nassa, is a species of sea snail, a marine gastropod mollusk in the family Nassariidae, the Nassa mud snails or dog whelks.

== Description ==
The length of the shell varies between 15 mm and 45 mm.

The ovate, conical shell is smooth andof a uniform ashy white color. The spire is composed of eight whorls. The upper ones are slightly plaited, the lowest pretty large, marked with more or less straight, longitudinal lines, approximate, and of a color a little deeper and reddish. The base of the shell is ornamented with six or seven furrows. The ovate aperture is, white, fawn-colored within. The thick outer lip is arcuated towards the base, elevated exteriorly into a thick, very prominent margin. Within it is striated throughout its whole length. The left lip is thick, and partially covering the columella, which is adorned with guttules one half of its length. The first of these guttules, which is uppermost, is much more marked than the others. At the base of the columella is found a very prominent fold, terminated by a guttule formed like a flattened point.

== Distribution ==
This marine species occurs in the tropical Western Pacific, off East India, the Philippines, Papua New Guinea and Australia (New South Wales, the Northern Territory, Queensland, Western Australia)

== Parasites ==
- Stephanostomum-like cercariae from Australia: Cercaria capricornia VII and Cercaria capricornia VIII
