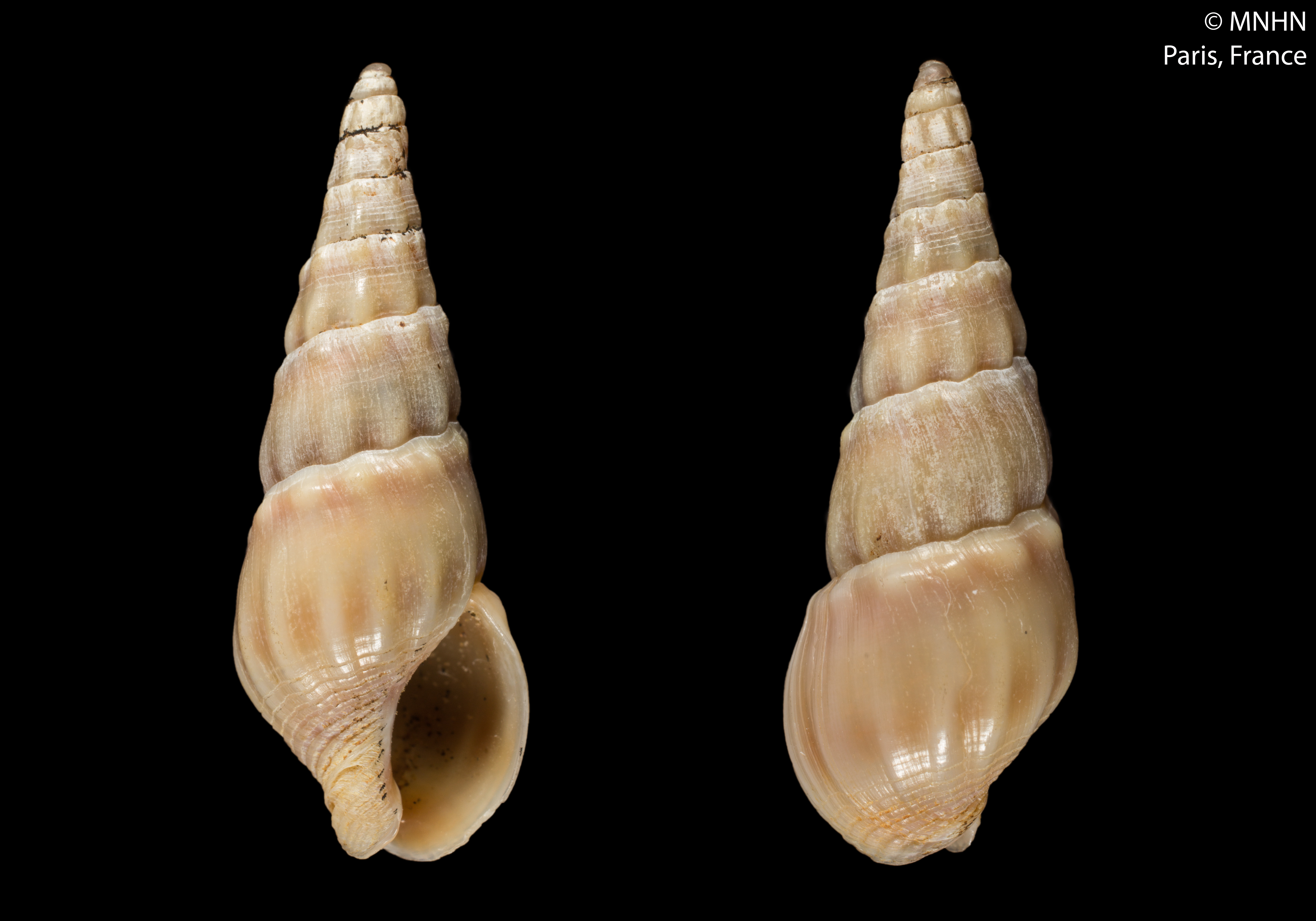
- Shell of Bullia terebraeformis (holotype at MNHN, Paris)

Scientific classification
- Kingdom: Animalia
- Phylum: Mollusca
- Class: Gastropoda
- Subclass: Caenogastropoda
- Order: Neogastropoda
- Family: Nassariidae
- Genus: Bullia
- Species: B. terebraeformis

Binomial name
- Bullia terebraeformis (Dautzenberg, 1912)

Synonyms
- Dorsanum (Fluviodorsum) terebraeforme Dautzenberg, 1912; Dorsanum terebraeforme Dautzenberg, 1912 (original combination)

= Bullia terebraeformis =

Species of mollusc

Bullia terebraeformis is a species of sea snail, a marine gastropod mollusk in the family Nassariidae, the Nassa mud snails or dog whelks.
