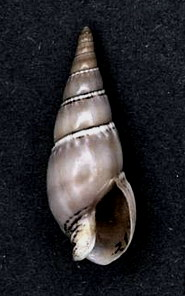
- Apertural view of a shell of Naytia granulosa (museum specimen at Naturalis Biodiversity Center)

Scientific classification
- Kingdom: Animalia
- Phylum: Mollusca
- Class: Gastropoda
- Subclass: Caenogastropoda
- Order: Neogastropoda
- Family: Nassariidae
- Genus: Naytia
- Species: N. granulosa

Binomial name
- Naytia granulosa (Lamarck, 1822)

Synonyms
- Bullia (Pseudostrombus) fusca Craven, 1883; Bullia fusca Craven, 1882; Bullia granulosa (Lamarck, 1822); Dorsanum (Fluviodorsum) granulosum (Lamarck, 1822); Dorsanum granulosum (Lamarck, 1822); Terebra granulosa Lamarck, 1822 (original combination)

= Naytia granulosa =

Species of gastropod

Naytia granulosa is a species of sea snail, a marine gastropod mollusk in the family Nassariidae, the Nassa mud snails or dog whelks.

== Description ==
The shell size varies between 16 mm and 34 mm.

== Distribution ==
This species occurs in the Atlantic Ocean off Gabon and Angola
