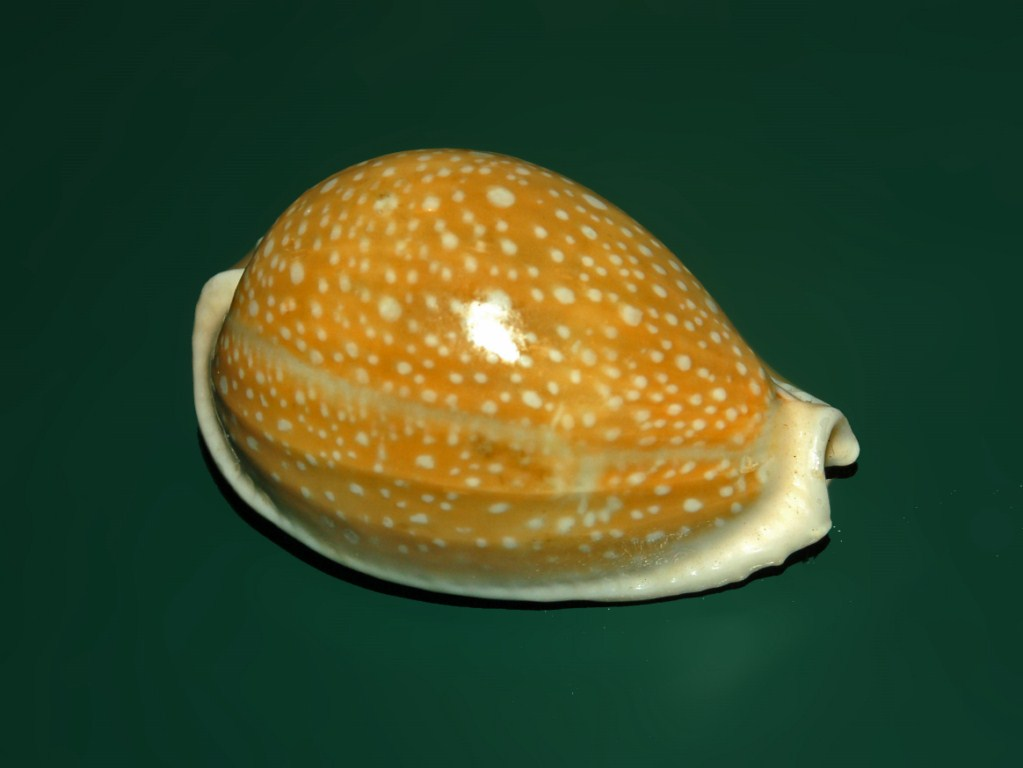
- A shells of Naria miliaris, dorsal view, anterior end towards the right

Scientific classification
- Kingdom: Animalia
- Phylum: Mollusca
- Class: Gastropoda
- Subclass: Caenogastropoda
- Order: Littorinimorpha
- Family: Cypraeidae
- Genus: Naria
- Species: N. miliaris

Binomial name
- Naria miliaris (Gmelin, 1791)

Synonyms
- Cypraea inocellata Gray; Cypraea miliaris Gmelin, 1791; Erosaria miliaris (Gmelin, 1791)

= Naria miliaris =

Species of gastropod

Naria miliaris, common name the millet cowry or the inocellate cowry or the military cowry, is a species of sea snail, a cowry, a marine gastropod mollusk in the family Cypraeidae, the cowries.

== Description ==
The shells of these very common cowries reach on average 32–38 millimetres (1.3–1.5 in) of length, with a minimum size of 17 millimetres (0.67 in) and a maximum size of 56 millimetres (2.2 in). The dorsum surface of these smooth and shiny shells is generally pale brown or yellowish, with several small white spots. The base is white or pink, with several fine teeth. In the living cowries the mantle is pale brown and greyish, with long tree-shaped sensorial papillae. This species is quite similar to Naria lamarckii, but in Naria miliaris the edges of the shell are white, without any spots.

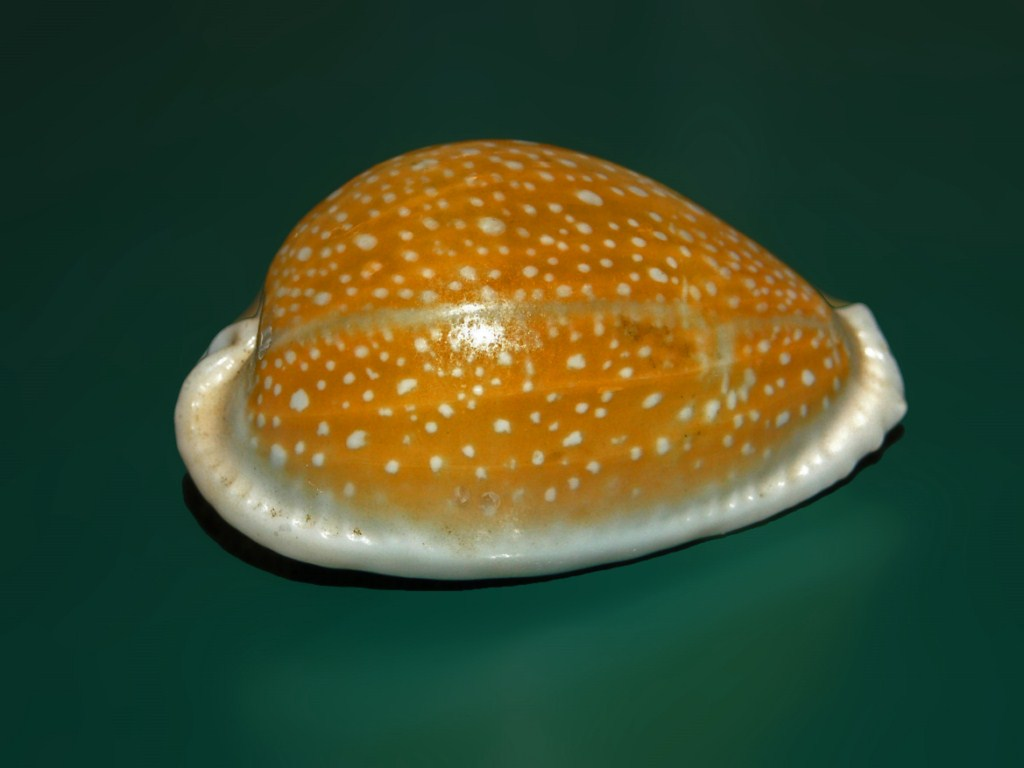
A shells of Naria miliaris, lateral view, anterior end towards the right

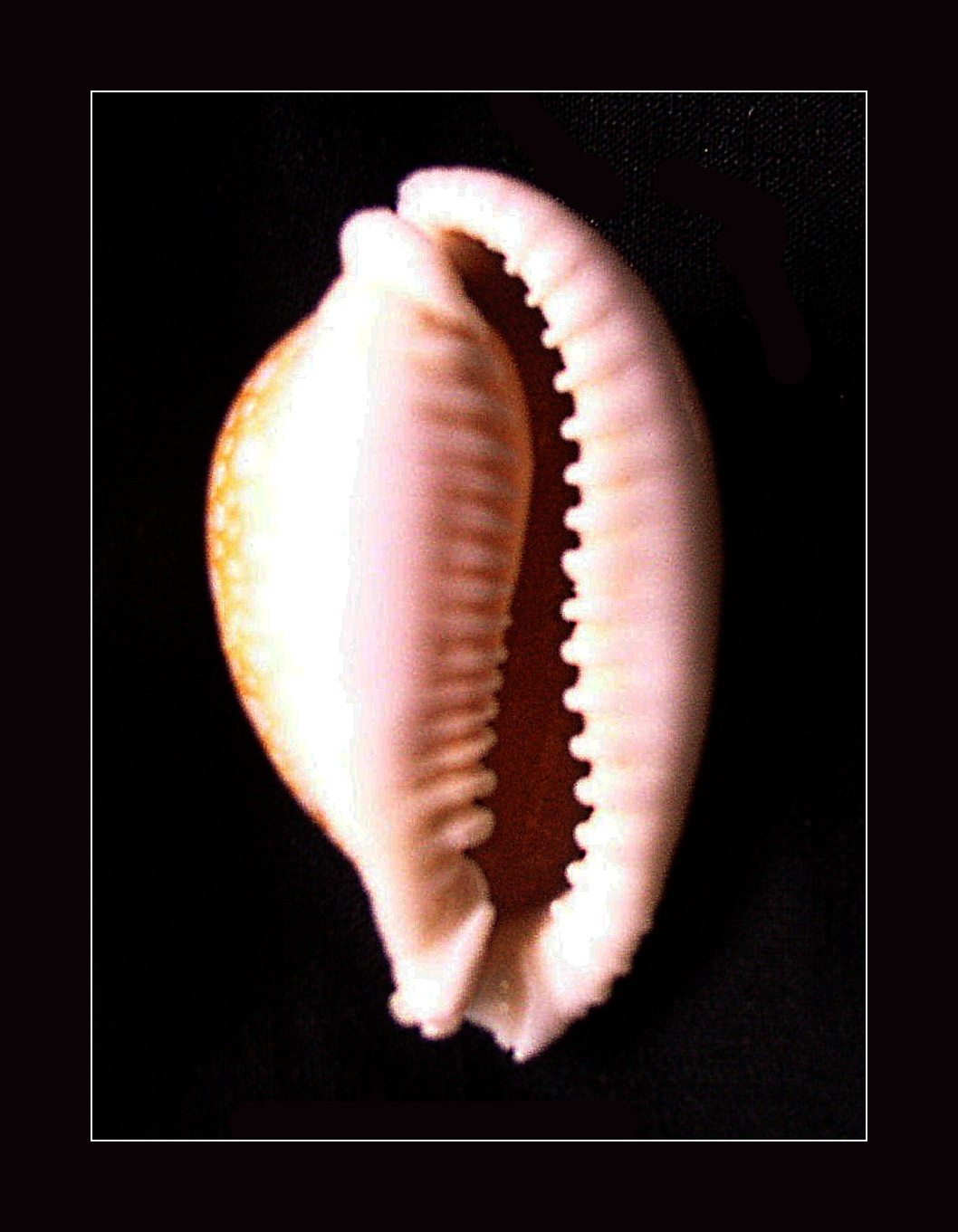
Apertural view of a shells of Naria miliaris

== Distribution ==
This species is distributed in the Indian Ocean along Madagascar and Tanzania and in the western Pacific Ocean to Australia, along Japan, East China, Taiwan, Vietnam, East Thailand, East Malaysia, Flores, North Borneo, Java, Philippines and northwestern Australia.
