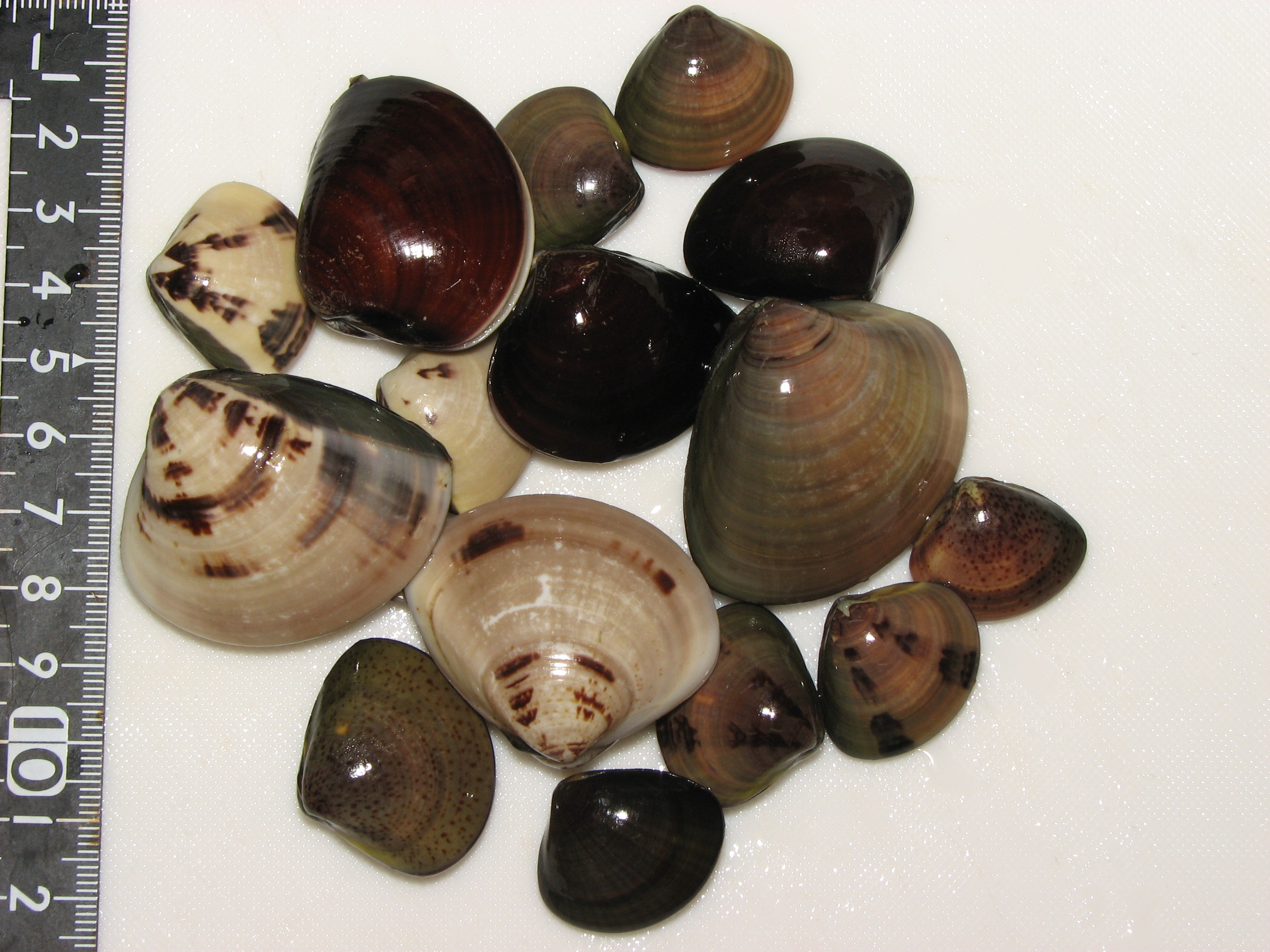

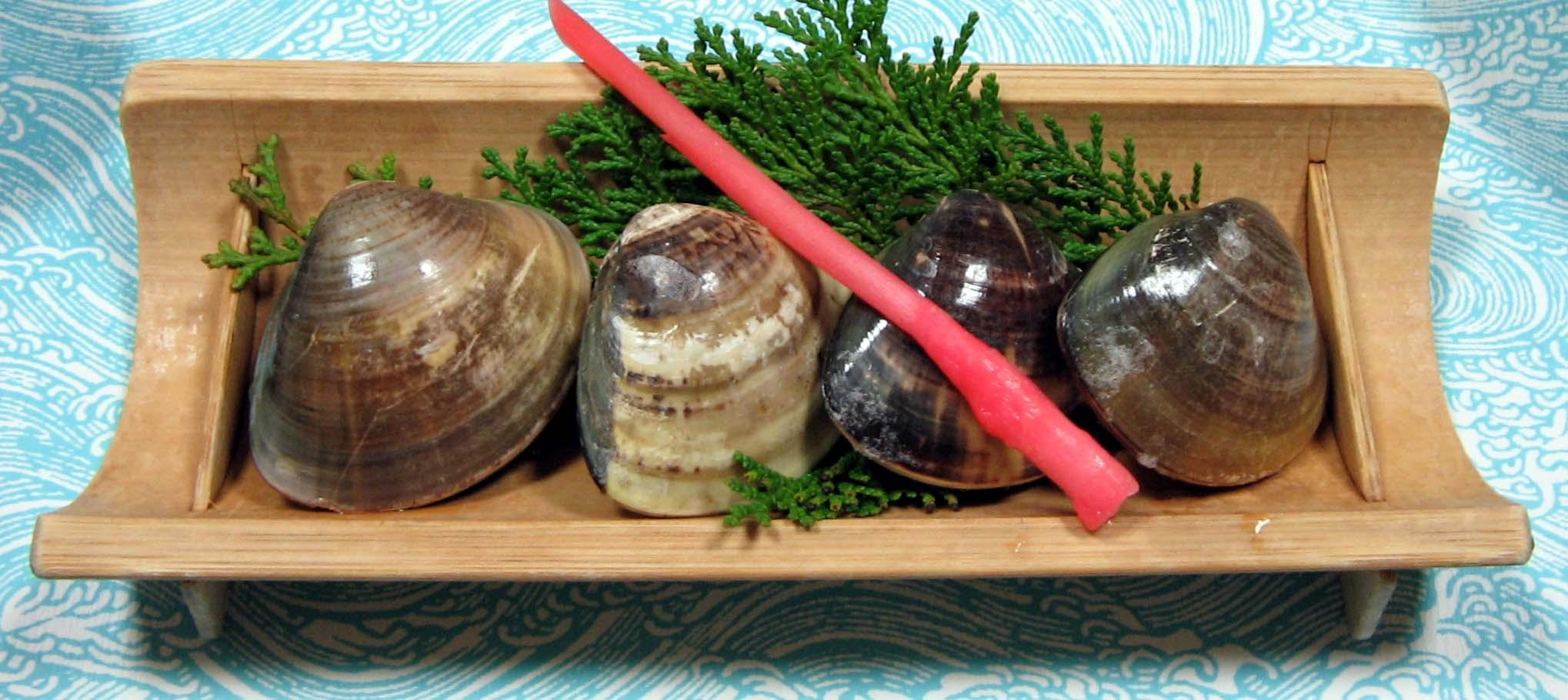

Scientific classification
- Kingdom: Animalia
- Phylum: Mollusca
- Class: Bivalvia
- Order: Venerida
- Family: Veneridae
- Genus: Meretrix
- Species: M. lusoria

Binomial name
- Meretrix lusoria Röding, 1798

= Meretrix lusoria =

Species of mollusc

Capture (blue) and aquaculture (green) production of Japanese hard clam (Meretrix lusoria) in thousand tonnes from 1950 to 2022, as reported by the FAO

Meretrix lusoria, the hamaguri, Asian hard clam or common Orient clam, is a species of saltwater clam, a marine bivalve mollusk in the family Veneridae, the Venus clams. This species is native to Asia, originally described around the waters of Japan. It is commercially exploited for sushi, and its shells are traditionally used to make white go stones.

The hamaguri clam is the subject of a haiku by Matsuo Bashō.

Right and left valve of the same specimen:

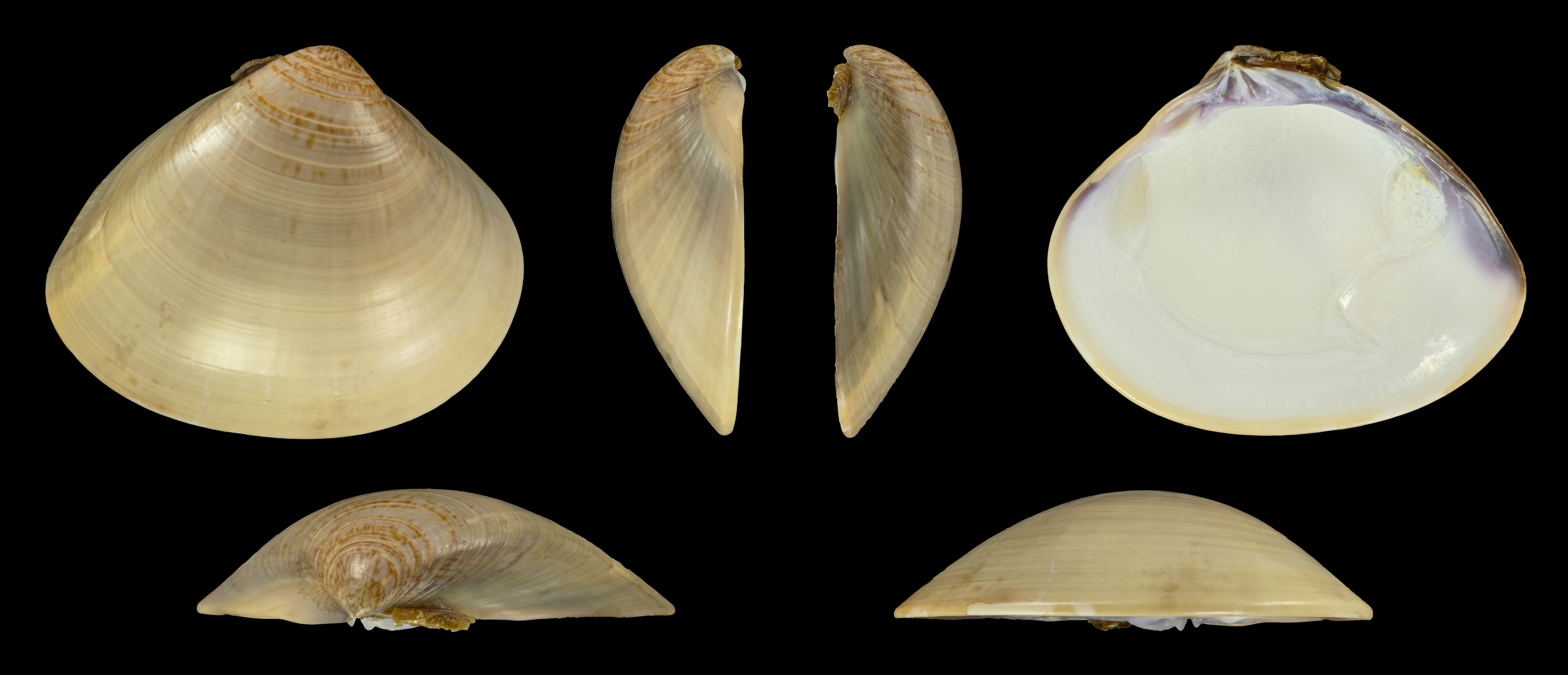
Right valve

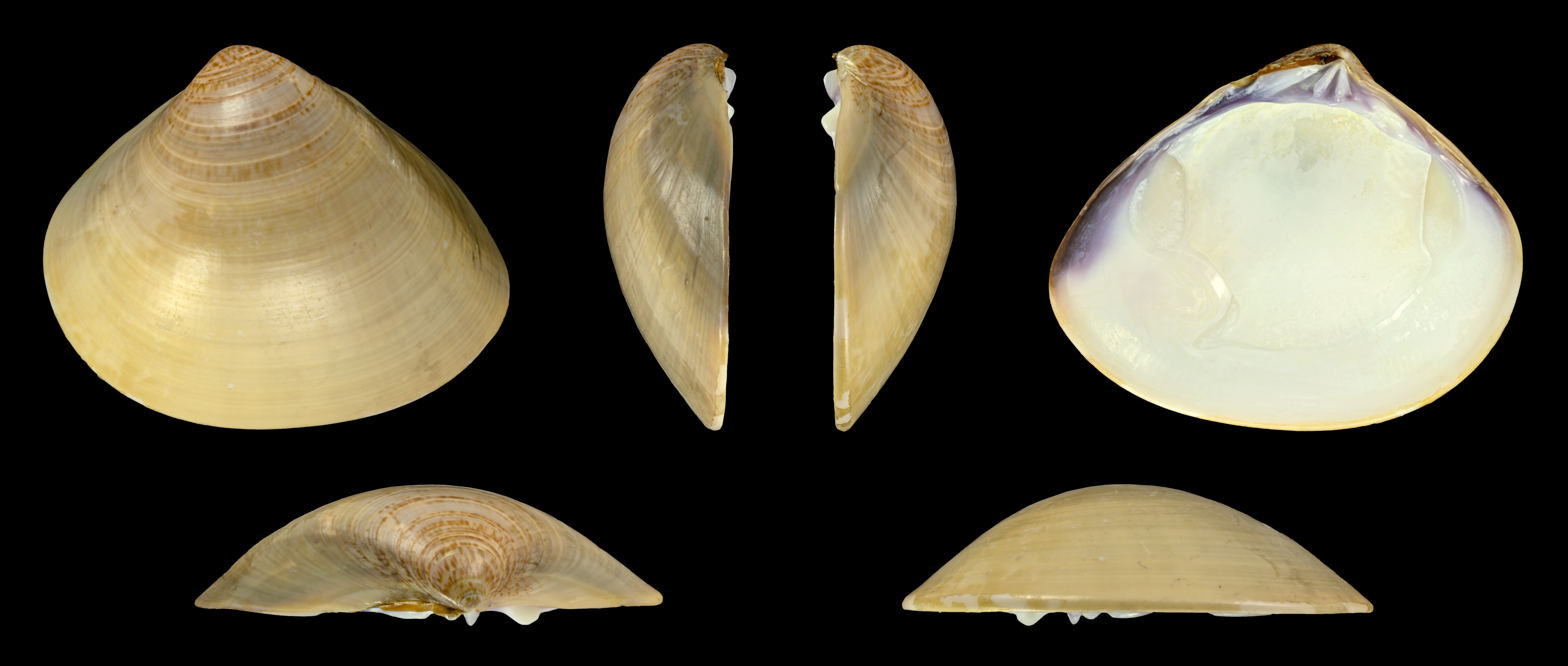
Left valve

== Taxonomic difficulties ==
Distribution of morphologically similar Meretrix species per Hsiao & Chuang (2023)

Meretrix lusoria is morphologically similar to a number of closely related species, making identification and reports of distribution quite confusing. Less precise sources may describe a large range in East Asia, in waters tropic to temperate. However, as Hsiao & Chuang (2023) demonstrated using molecular (nuclear + mtDNA) and multi-variate morphological means, it is possible to distinguish several species:

- Meretrix lusoria, originally described around Japan, is distributed in the waters of Japan and South Korea.
- Metetrix petechialis is distributed in China's East and Yellow seas.
- Meretrix taiwanica, misidentified as others on the list until 2023, is found around Taiwan and southern China.
- Meretrix meretrix, originally described by Linnaeus in the Indian Ocean, is found around Indian Ocean and Southeast Asia.

There is one report in 2022 of M. lusoria appearing in Sarawak (Malaysian Borneo). The identification was confirmed by mtDNA phylogeny matching to Japanese M. lusoria. Interestingly, what appeared morphologically to be M. meretrix and M. lyrata at the same site gave very similar mtDNA results.

== Gallery ==
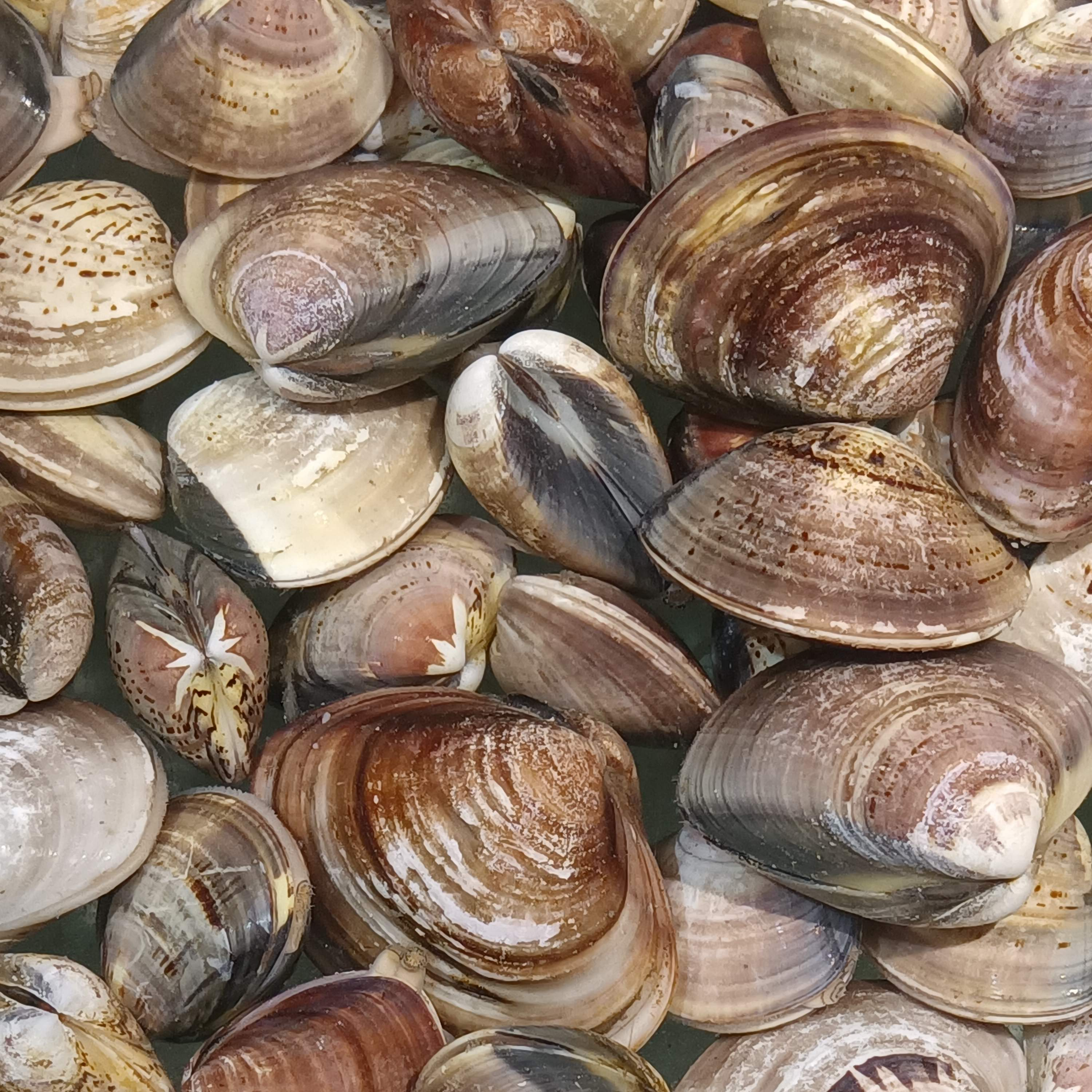

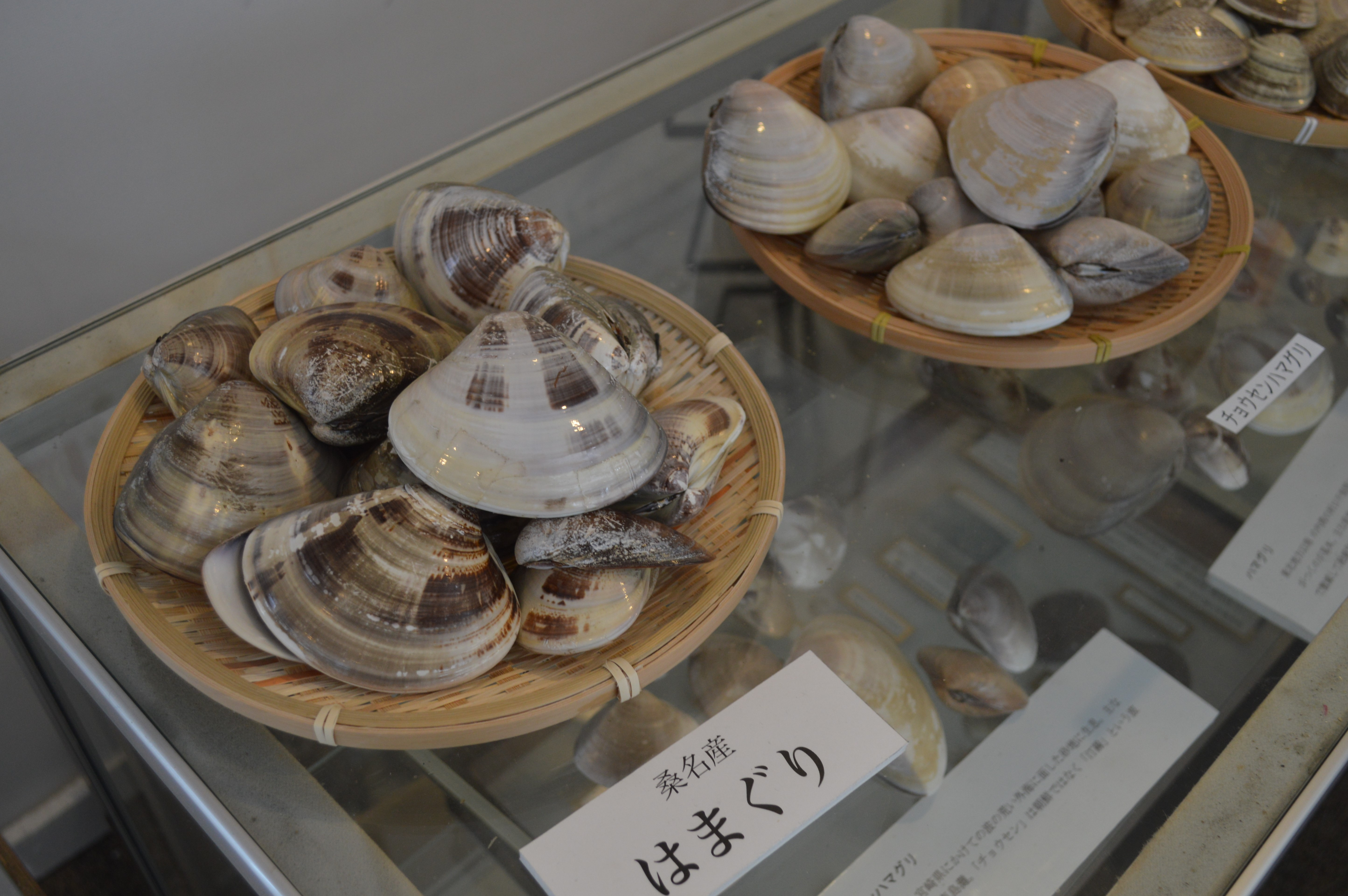

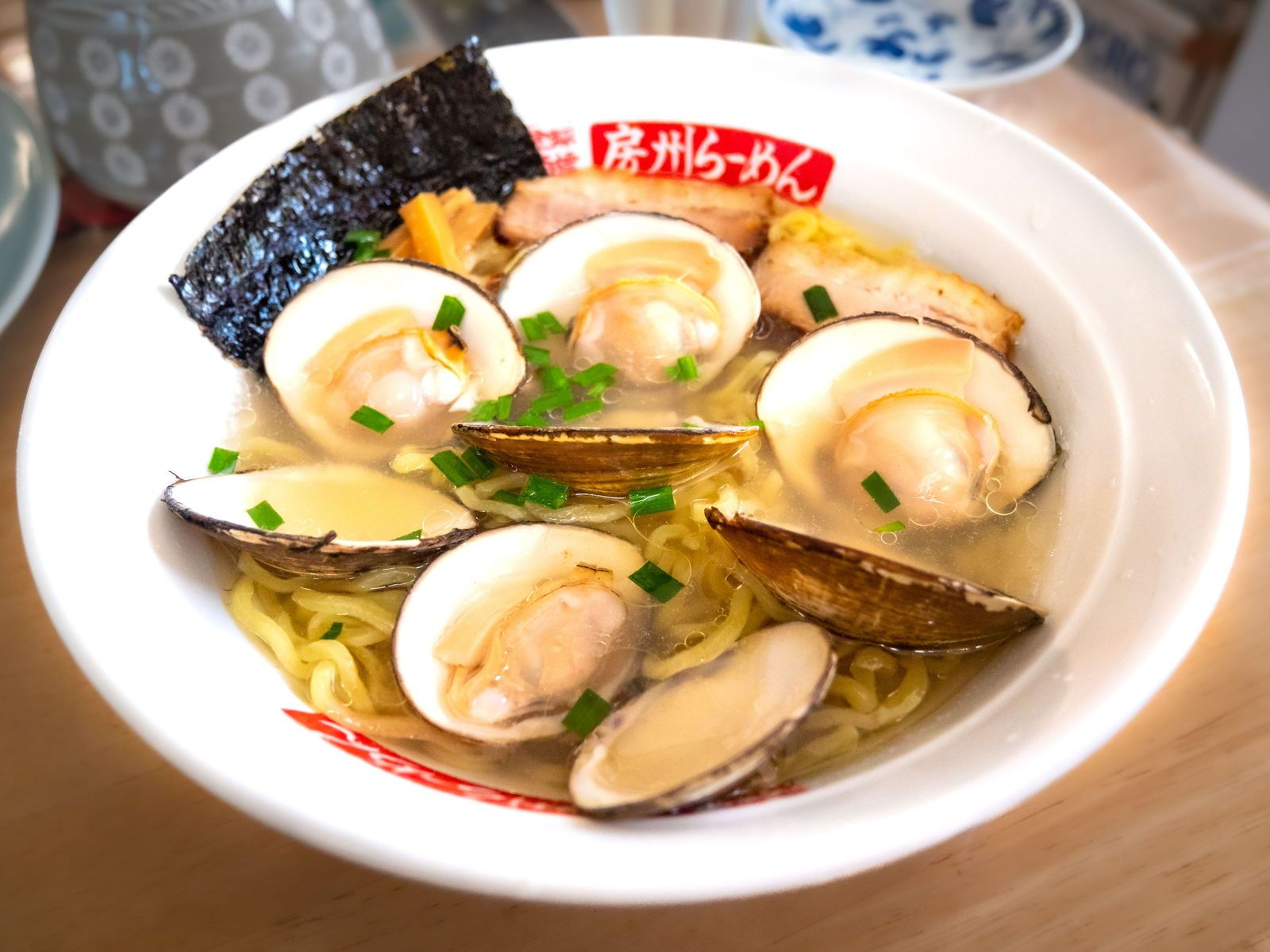
In ramen

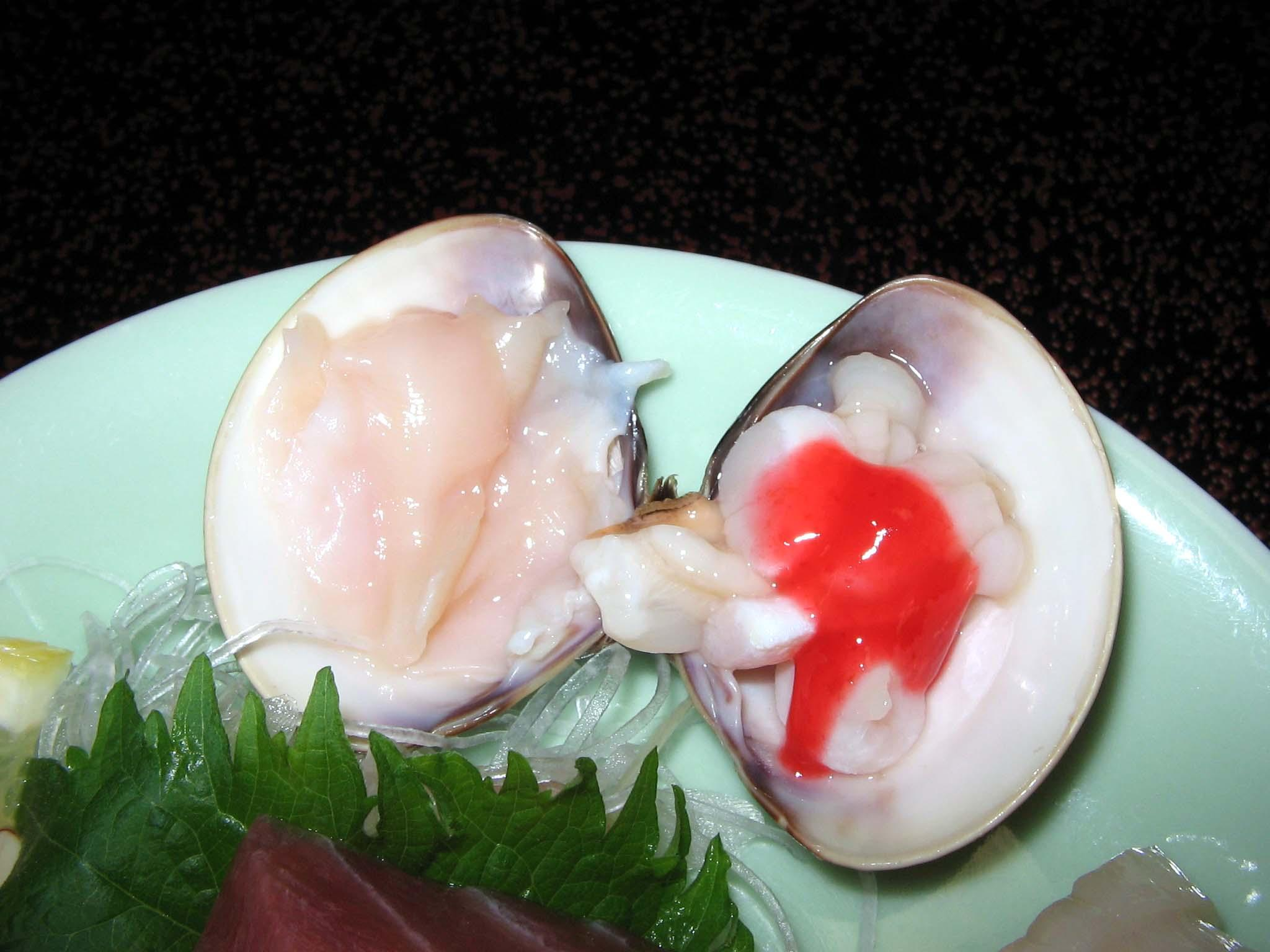
As sashimi

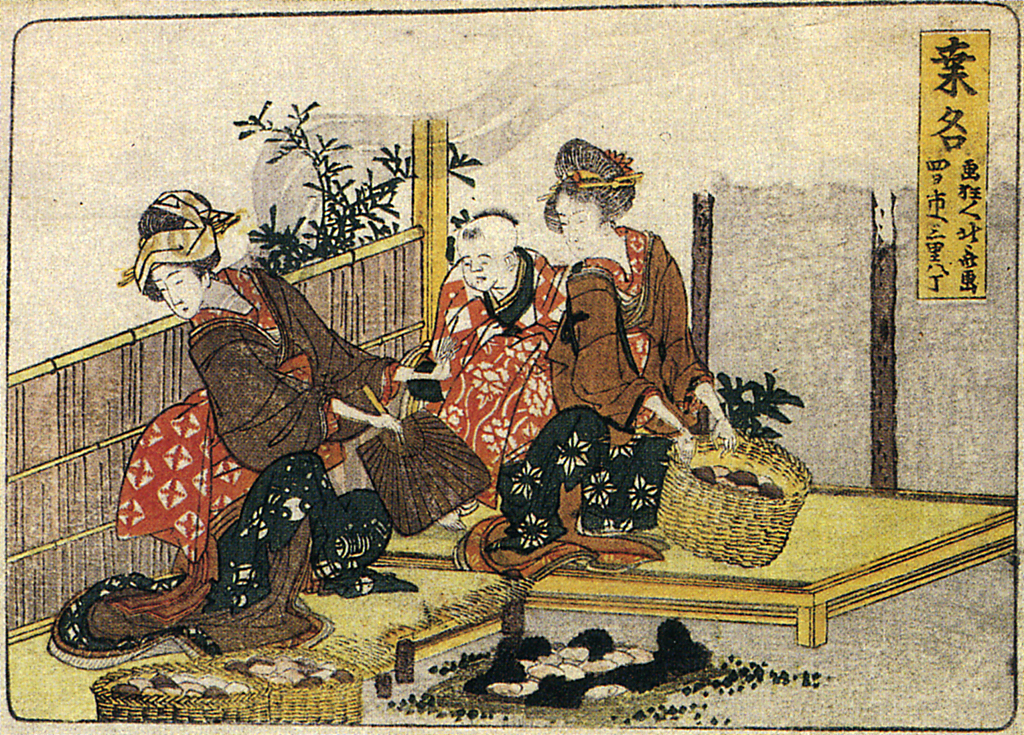
Women baking hamaguri clams, print by Hokusai

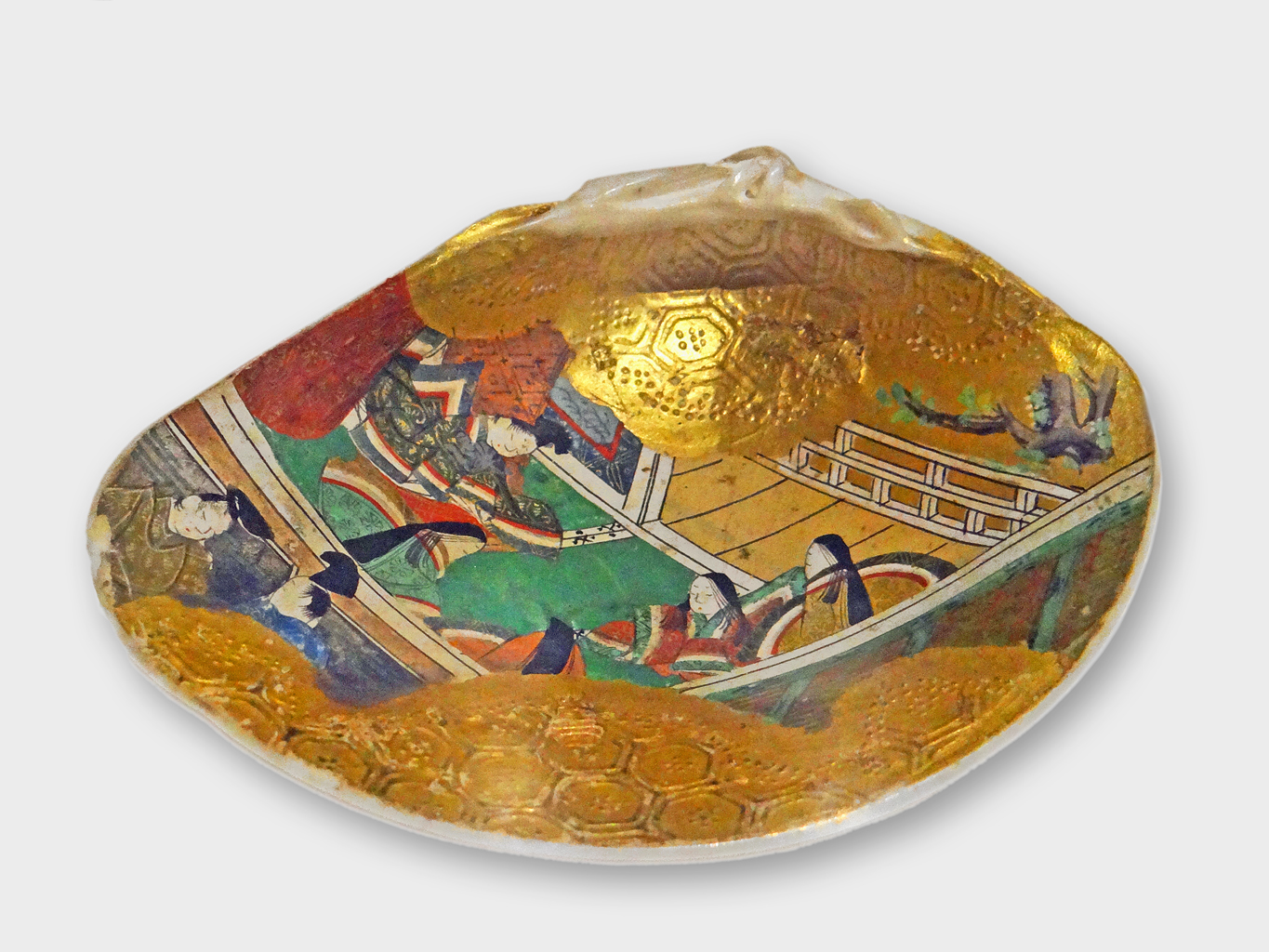
Painted hamaguri shell as a game piece for Kai-awase, 18th century

== See also ==
- Kai-awase, a Japanese game with hamaguri shells
