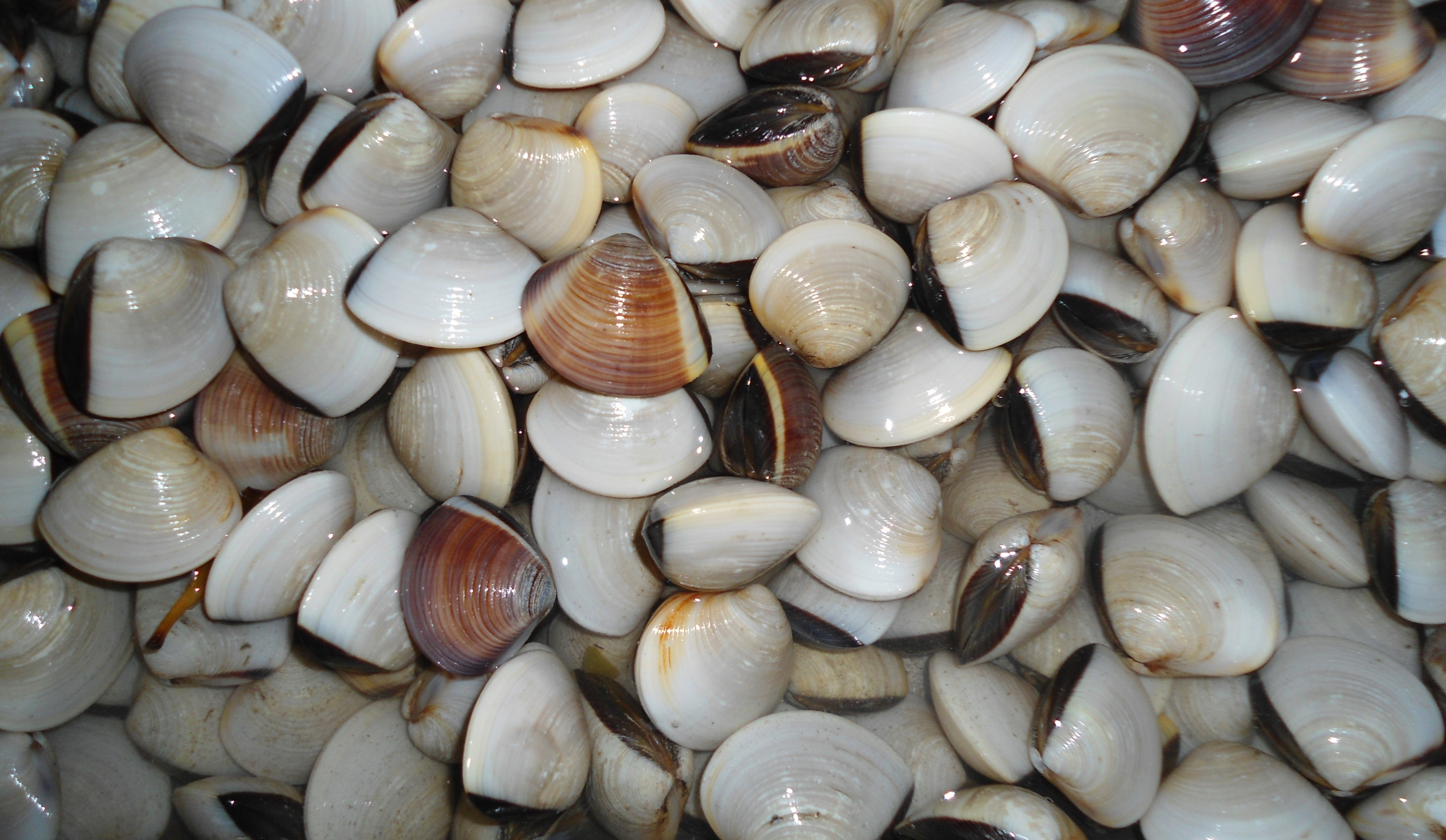
- Meretrix lyrata (Sowerby, 1851) for sale as food in a market in Haikou City, Hainan Province, China
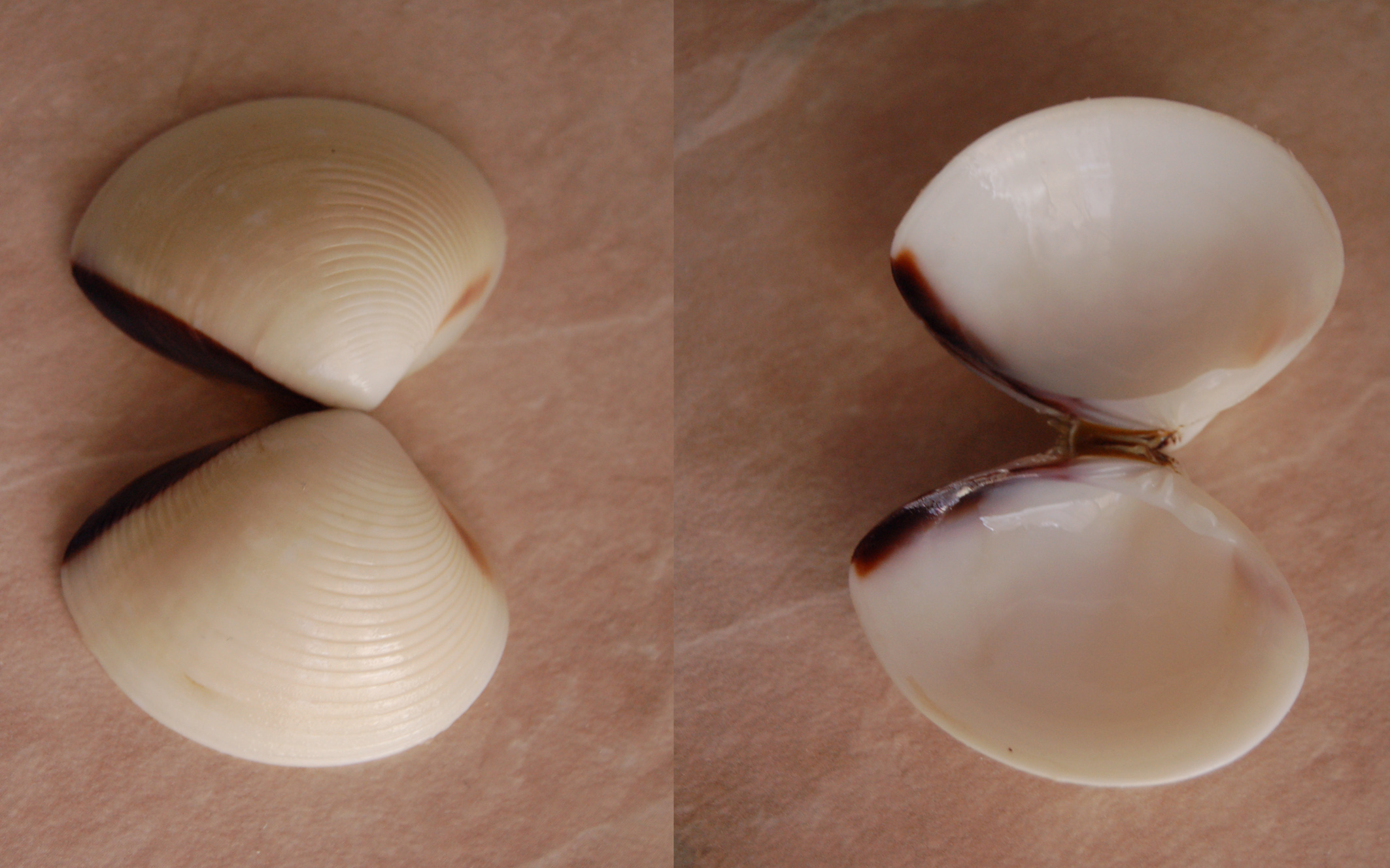
- A whole shell of Meretrix lyrata showing both the outside and the inside

Scientific classification
- Kingdom: Animalia
- Phylum: Mollusca
- Class: Bivalvia
- Order: Venerida
- Superfamily: Veneroidea
- Family: Veneridae
- Genus: Meretrix; Lamarck 1799

Type species
- Meretrix lyrata Sowerby 1851

Species
- See text

Synonyms
- Cytheraea (Meretrix) Lamarck 1805; Cytherea (Meretrix) Lamarck 1805

= Meretrix (bivalve) =

Meretrix Temporal range: Cenomanian–Present ~94.3–0 Ma

Genus of bivalves

Meretrix is a genus of edible saltwater clams, marine bivalve molluscs in the family Veneridae, the Venus clams. The genus first appeared in the fossil record during the Cenomanian.

== Genomics ==
Chromosome-level genome assemblies of Meretrix lamarckii and Meretrix meretrix, providing the first reference genomes for those species, were published in 2026. The genomes are approximately 891 Mb and 835 Mb in size, respectively, and each comprises 19 pseudochromosomes.

A telomere-to-telomere genome assembly of Meretrix taiwanica, providing the first reference genome for the species, was published in 2026. The haplotype-resolved assemblies are approximately 1.01 Gb in size and each comprises 19 pseudochromosomes.

== Species ==
Species in the genus Meretrix include:

- Meretrix lamarckii
- Meretrix meretrix
- Meretrix lusoria
- Meretrix lyrata
- Meretrix taiwanica
- †Meretrix chalcedonica, early Danian Lefipán Formation, Cañadón Asfalto Basin, Argentina
- †Meretrix dalli, Paleocene Martinez Formation of California
- †Meretrix faba, Cenomanian Khatiyah Formation of the United Arab Emirates
- †Meretrix hikoshimensis, Oligocene Ashiya Group of Japan
- †Meretrix hornii, Paleocene to Eocene California
- †Meretrix indica, Paleocene Hangu Shales of Pakistan
- †Meretrix negritosensis, Miocene Zorritos Formation of Peru
- †Meretrix nuttalliopsis, Eocene Boca de Serpiente Formation of Trinidad and Tobago
- †Meretrix persica, Miocene of Iran and India
- †Meretrix shantii, Eocene Umm al-Rua'us Formation of Saudi Arabia
- †Meretrix stantoni, Paleocene California
- †Meretrix subimpressa, Eocene Trinidad and Tobago and Maryland
- †Meretrix uvasana, Paleocene to Eocene California
