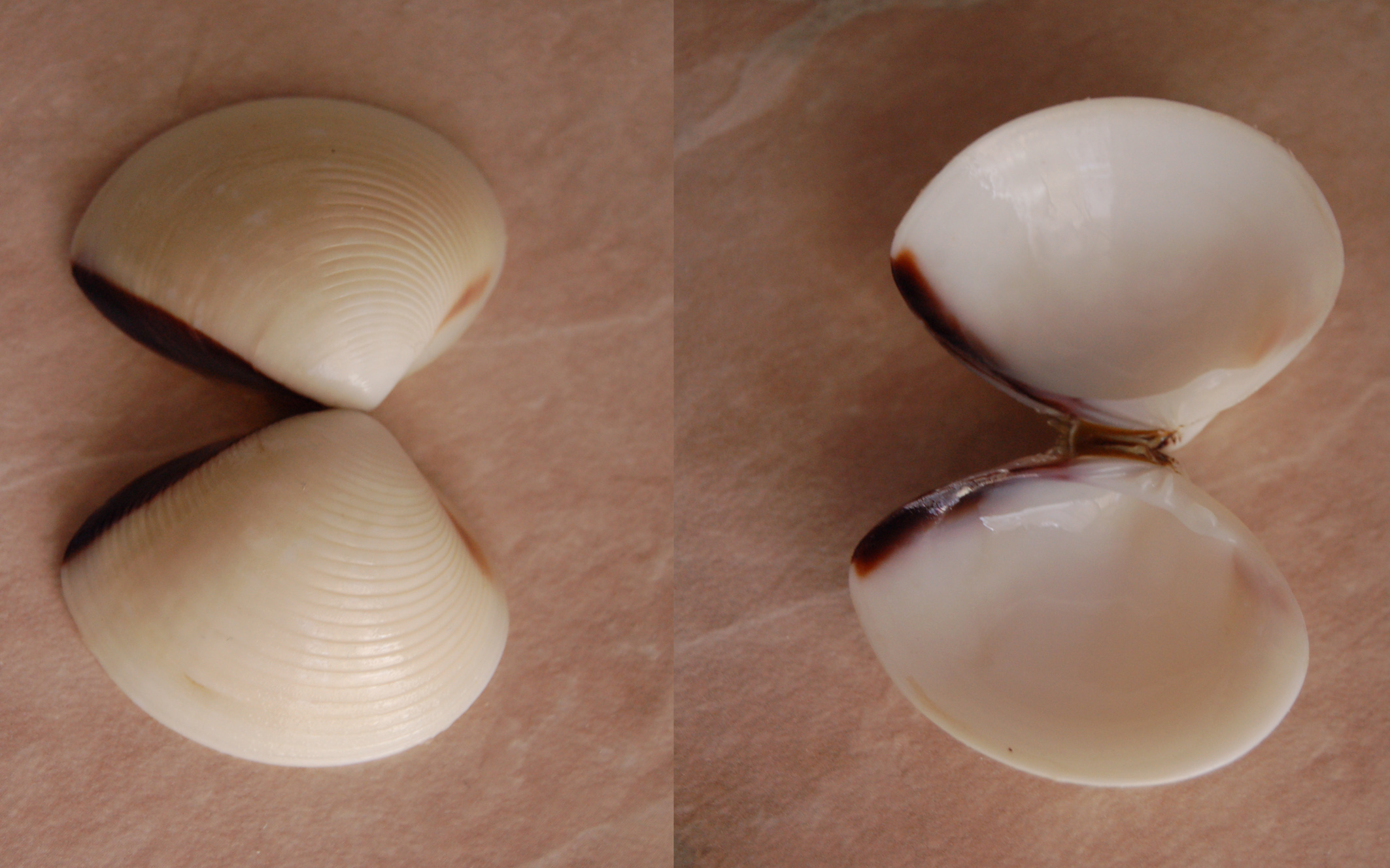
- A whole shell of Meretrix lyrata showing both the outside and the inside
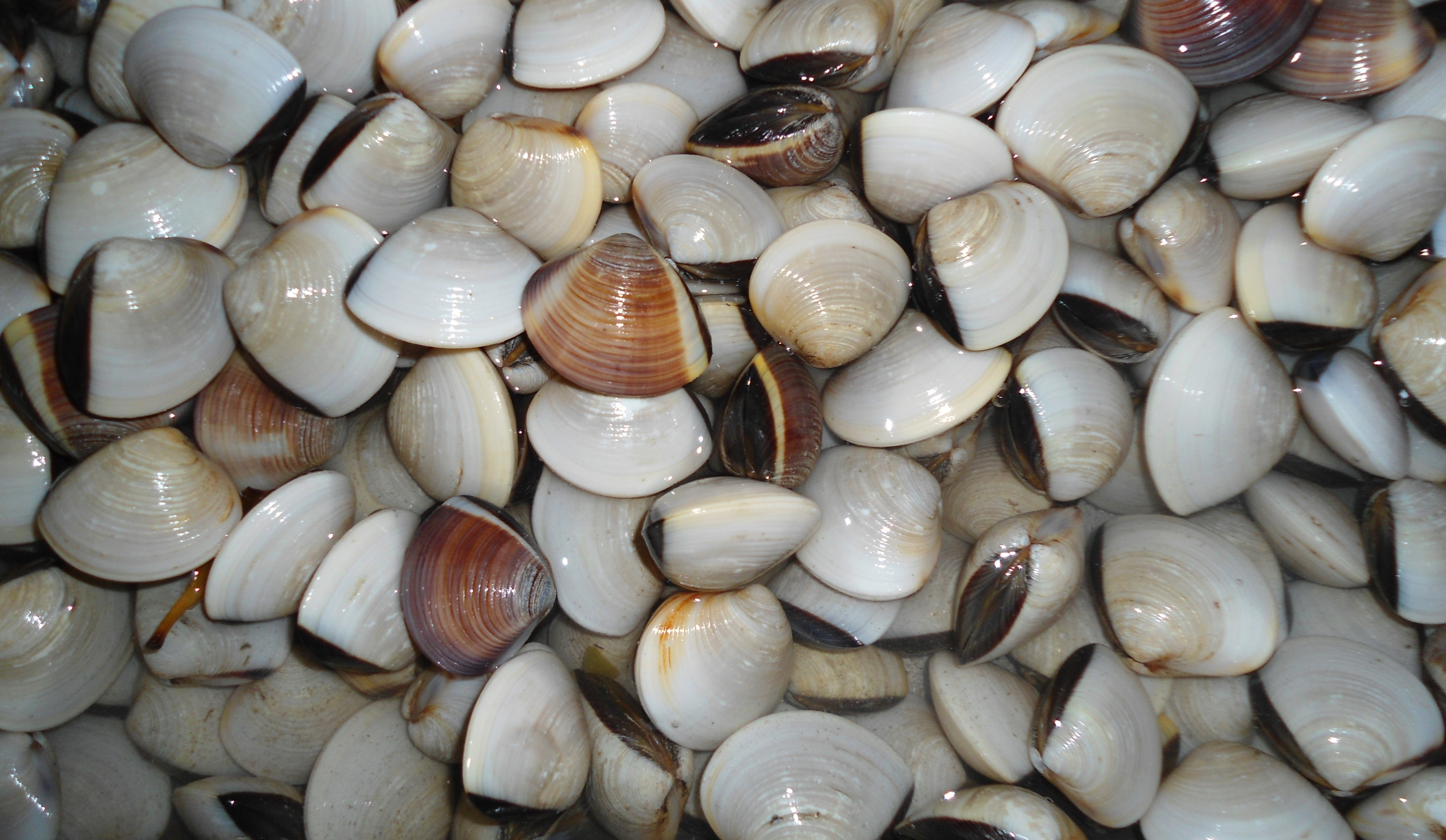
- Live Meretrix lyrata for sale as sea food in a market in Haikou City, Hainan Province, China

Scientific classification
- Kingdom: Animalia
- Phylum: Mollusca
- Class: Bivalvia
- Order: Venerida
- Superfamily: Veneroidea
- Family: Veneridae
- Genus: Meretrix
- Species: M. lyrata

Binomial name
- Meretrix lyrata (Sowerby II, 1851)

Synonyms
- Cytherea lyrata Sowerby, 1851

= Meretrix lyrata =

Lyrate asiatic hard clam

Species of bivalve

Meretrix lyrata, the lyrate Asiatic hard clam, also known simply as the hard clam (Vietnamese: Nghêu Bến Tre), is an edible saltwater clam, a marine bivalve mollusc in the family Veneridae, the Venus clams.

This species occurs along the coasts of Vietnam, Taiwan, the Philippines, Sarawak (Malaysian Borneo) and South China.

Right and left valve of the same specimen:

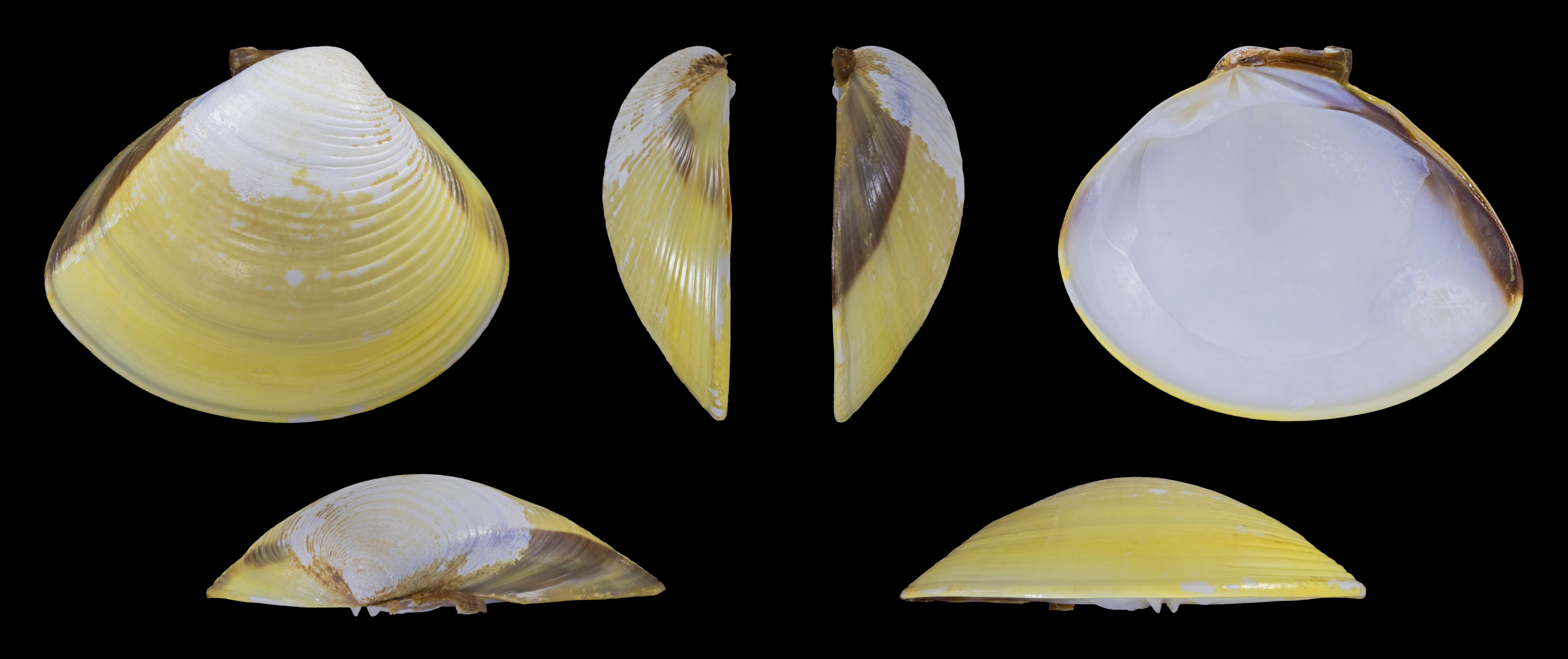
Right valve

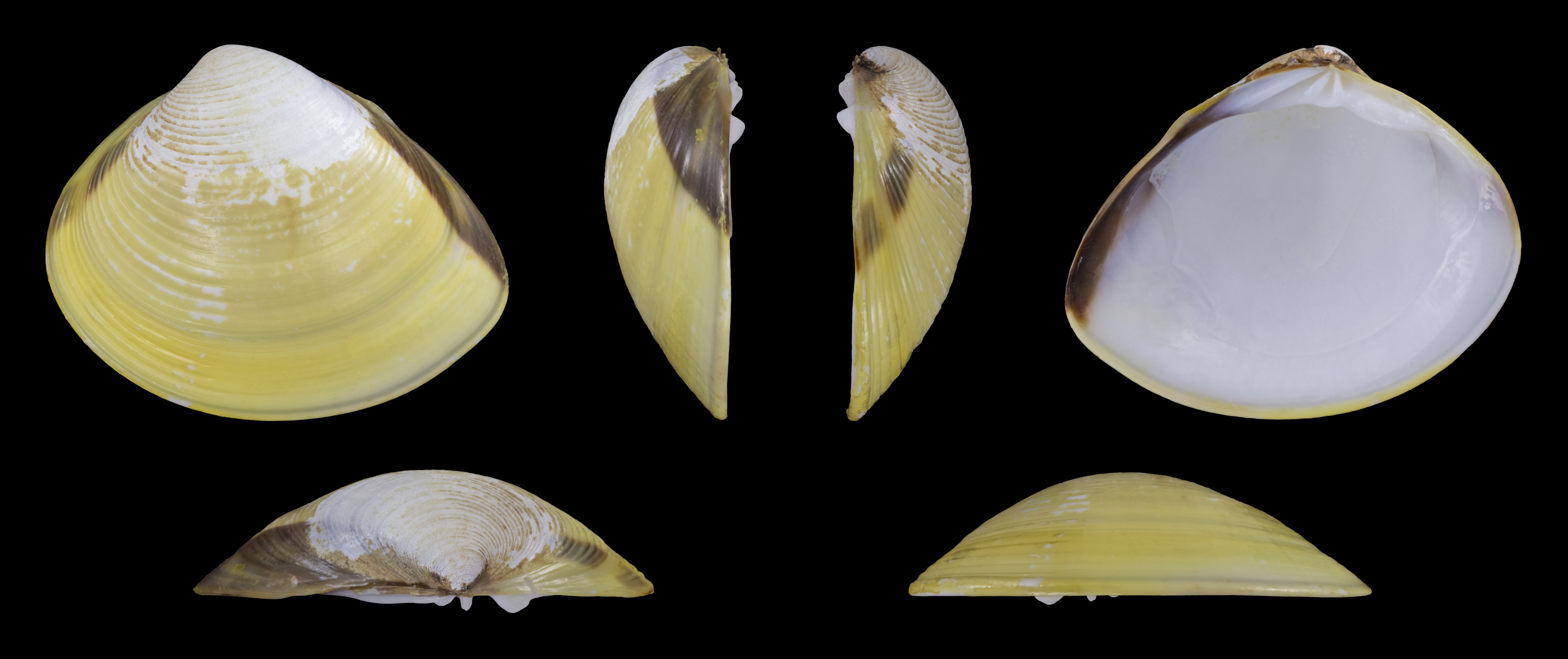
Left valve

== Culinary use ==
In Vietnam, these hard clams are eaten boiled, steamed or roasted. They are an important export in the eastern and southern parts of Vietnam.
