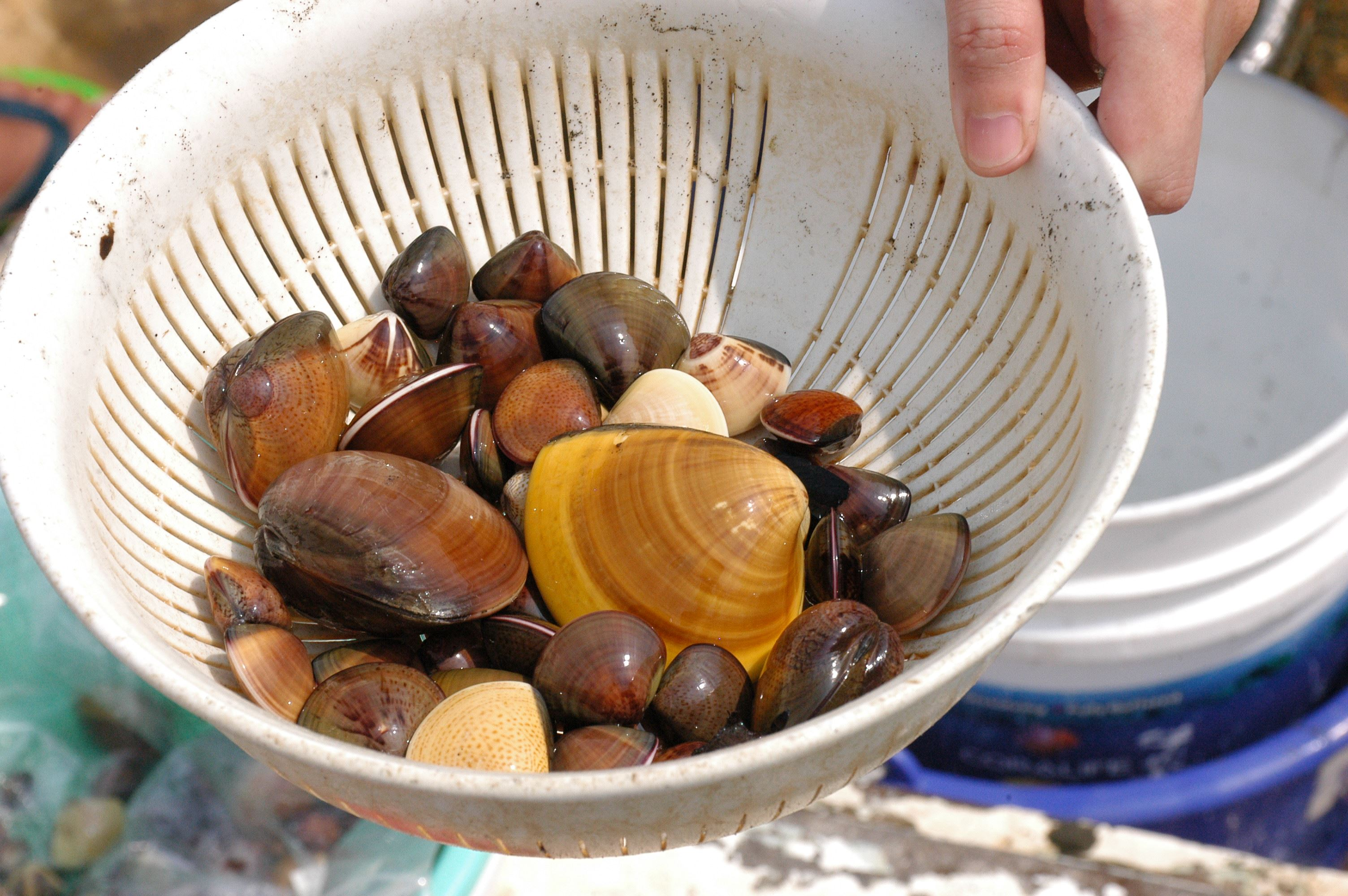

Scientific classification
- Kingdom: Animalia
- Phylum: Mollusca
- Class: Bivalvia
- Order: Venerida
- Family: Veneridae
- Genus: Meretrix
- Species: M. taiwanica

Binomial name
- Meretrix taiwanica Hsiao & Chuang, 2023

= Meretrix taiwanica =

Species of clam

Meretrix taiwanica is a species of clam indigenous to Taiwan and China. In Taiwan, it was misidentified as Meretrix lusoria until 2023.

== Description ==
The shell color is highly variable from yellow-white to dark red-brown.

== Genomics ==
A telomere-to-telomere, haplotype-resolved chromosome-level genome assembly of Meretrix taiwanica was published in 2026. The assembled genome spans approximately 1.01 Gb and is organized into 19 chromosomes in each haplotype. BUSCO analysis of the diploid assembly indicated a completeness of 92.8%. A total of 23,320 and 23,598 protein-coding genes were predicted in the two haplotypes. This represented the first telomere-to-telomere reference genome published for the species.

== Distribution and habitat ==
Distribution of morphologically similar Meretrix species

Meretrix taiwanica is found in Taiwan and along the coast of southern China.

It is commonly found in sandy estuaries associated with mangroves.

== Use ==
Like similar Meretrix species, M. taiwanica is farmed commercially for food. 49,501 tons of "M. lusoria", now identified as M. taiwanica, was produced in the year of 2019 in Taiwan.

== Taxonomy ==
The clams present in Taiwan was misidentified as Meretrix lusoria or M. meretrix until 2023. Scientists conducting research on what they believed to be M. lusoria in the Tamsui River sent samples for genetic analysis and discovered that they were a genetically distinct species. M. lusoria was introduced into Taiwan for commercial cultivation during the Japanese colonial period and was believed to have outcompeted native clams. However, the new data suggests that M. lusoria were outcompeted by native M. taiwanica and died out soon after introduction.

An earlier research by Chinese scientists had already identified two separate lineages of M. petechialis in 2017. The 2023 study by Taiwanese scientists subsequently renamed the southern lineages as a separate species M. taiwanica.

== See also ==
- Taiwanica
