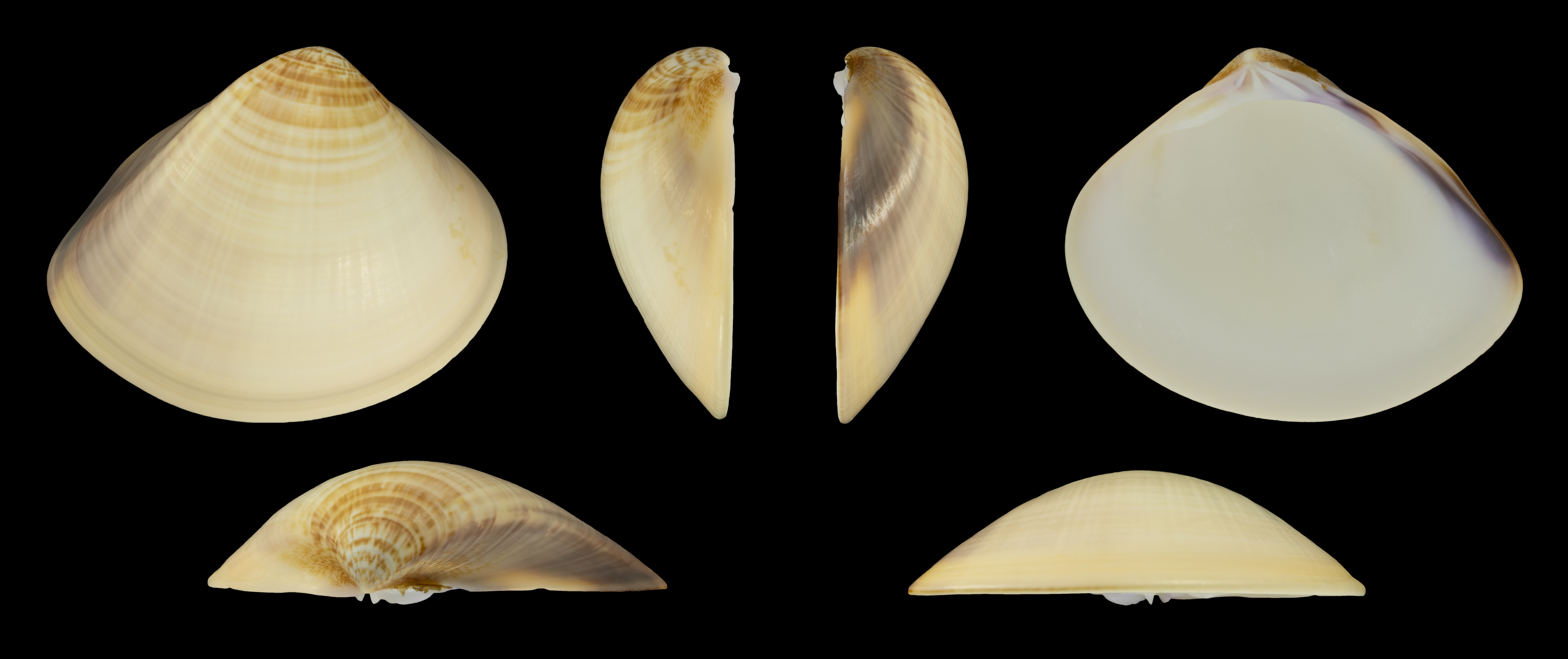
- Shell of Meretrix meretrix

Scientific classification
- Kingdom: Animalia
- Phylum: Mollusca
- Class: Bivalvia
- Order: Venerida
- Family: Veneridae
- Genus: Meretrix
- Species: M. meretrix

Binomial name
- Meretrix meretrix (Linnaeus, 1758)

= Meretrix meretrix =

Asiatic hard clam

Species of bivalve

Meretrix meretrix, the Asiatic hard clam, is a species of saltwater bivalve in the family Veneridae.

== Genomics ==
A chromosome-level genome assembly of Meretrix meretrix was published in 2026, providing the first reference genome for the species. The genome is approximately 835.1 Mb in size and comprises 19 pseudo-chromosomes. The assembly has a BUSCO completeness of 99.5% and contains 28,699 predicted protein-coding genes.
