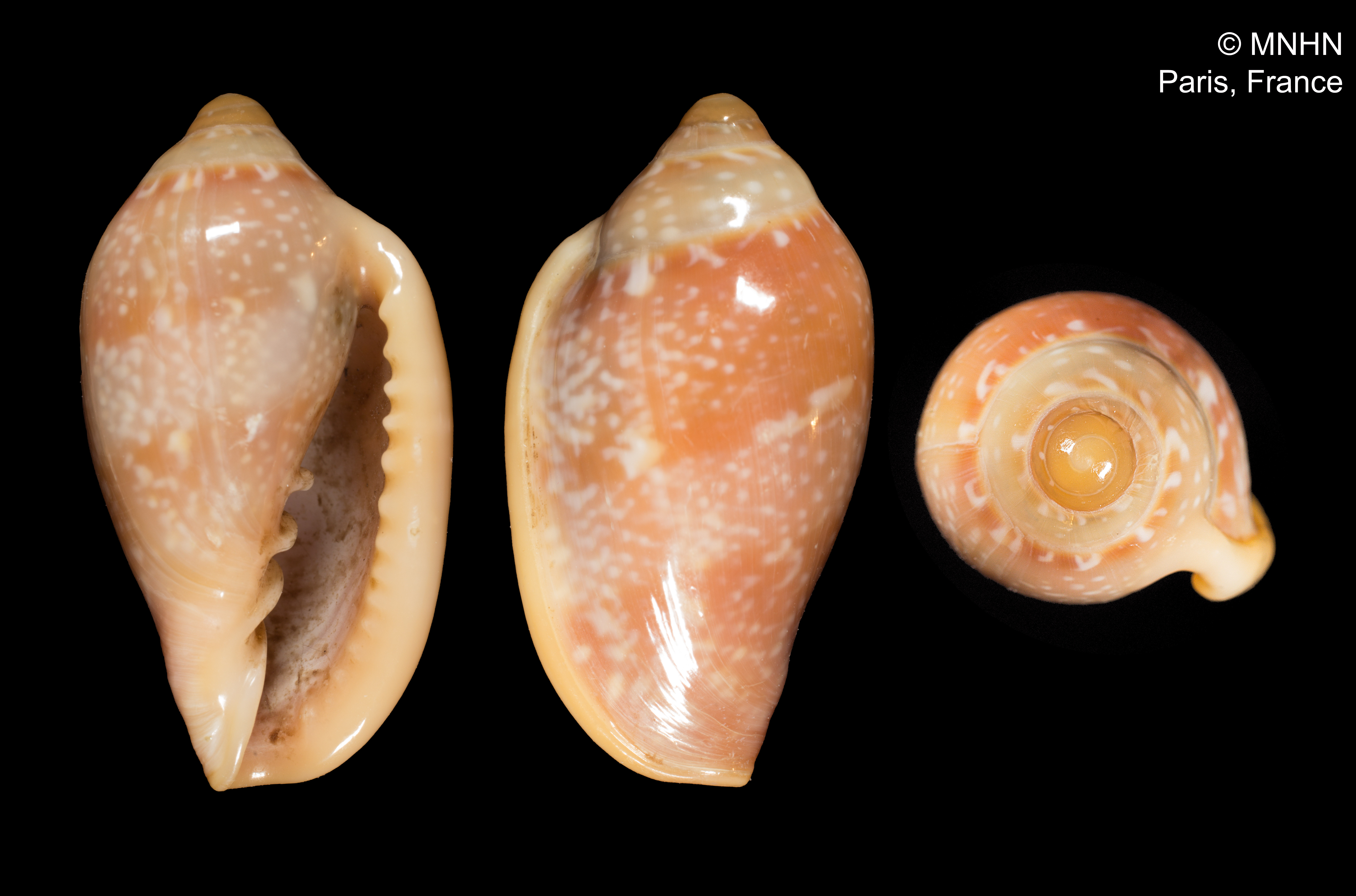
- Shell of Marginella lamarcki (holotype at MNHN, Paris)

Scientific classification
- Kingdom: Animalia
- Phylum: Mollusca
- Class: Gastropoda
- Subclass: Caenogastropoda
- Order: Neogastropoda
- Family: Marginellidae
- Subfamily: Marginellinae
- Genus: Marginella
- Species: M. lamarcki

Binomial name
- Marginella lamarcki Boyer, 2004

Synonyms
- Marginella (Marginella) lamarcki Boyer, 2004· accepted, alternate representation

= Marginella lamarcki =

Species of gastropod

Marginella lamarcki is a species of sea snail, a marine gastropod mollusk in the family Marginellidae, the margin snails.

== Description ==
The length of the shell varies between 22 mm and 30 mm.

== Distribution ==
This marine species occurs in the Atlantic Ocean off Senegal.
