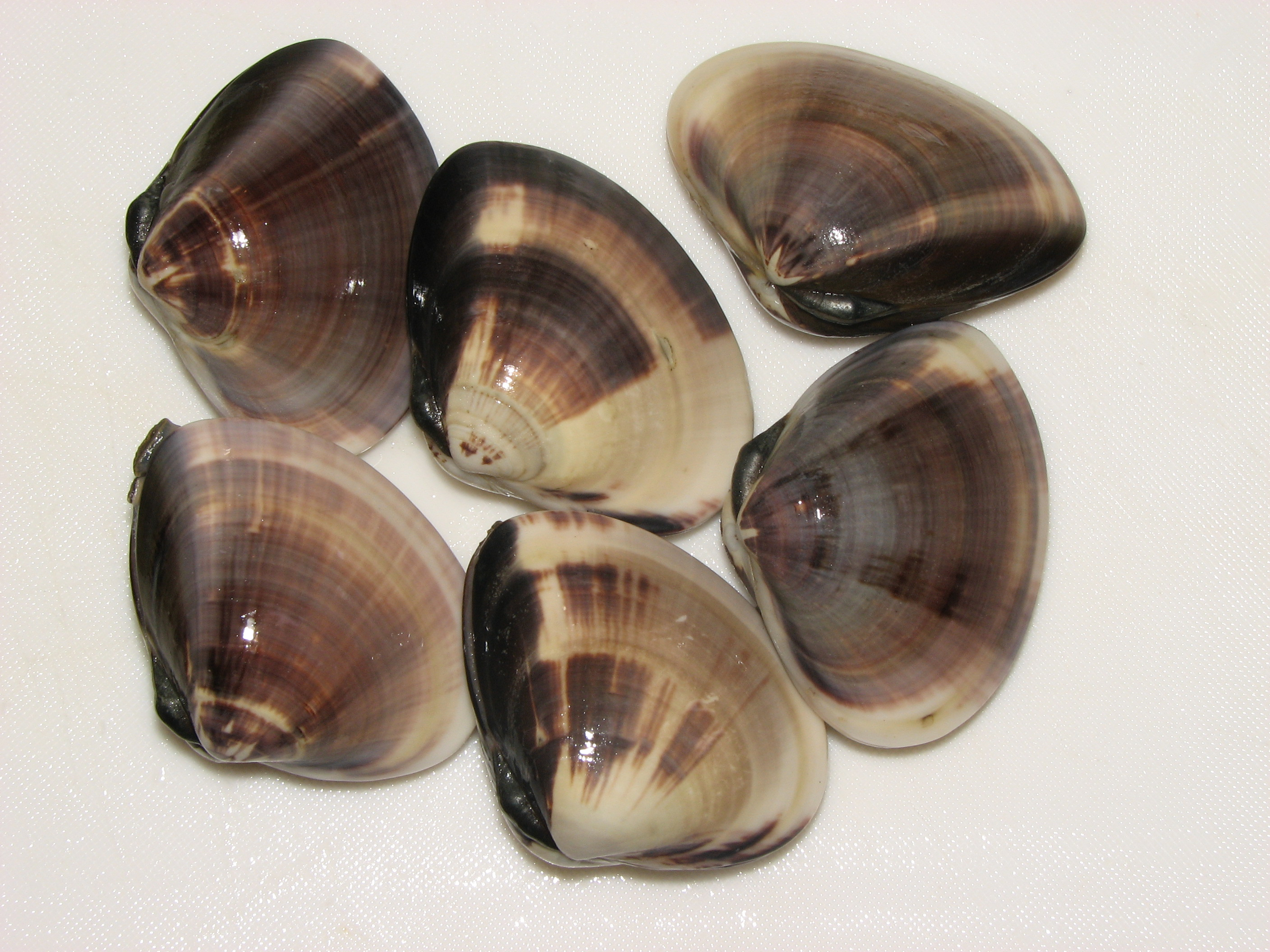

Scientific classification
- Kingdom: Animalia
- Phylum: Mollusca
- Class: Bivalvia
- Order: Venerida
- Family: Veneridae
- Genus: Meretrix
- Species: M. lamarckii

Binomial name
- Meretrix lamarckii Deshayes 1853

Synonyms
- Synonymy: Cytherea fusca Koch in Philippi 1845; Cytheraea morphina L.; Meretrix compressa Römer, 1866; Meretrix meretrix var. reevei Fischer-Piette & P. H. Fischer, 1941

= Meretrix lamarckii =

Korean hard clam

Species of bivalve

Meretrix lamarckii, also called Korean clam or Korean hard clam, is a species of saltwater bivalve in the family Veneridae. It is the second species of venerid clam where doubly uniparental inheritance (DUI) has been identified.

== Genomics ==
A chromosome-level genome assembly of Meretrix lamarckii was published in 2026, providing the first reference genome for the species. The genome is approximately 890.5 Mb in size and comprises 19 pseudo-chromosomes. The assembly has a BUSCO completeness of 99.5% and contains 33,346 predicted protein-coding genes.

== Ecology ==
It is a medium-sized clam which lives in sandy sediments from the subtidal zone to a depth of 20 meters. In the waters off Hyūga, Miyazaki, it spawns between late July and early September.

=== Relationship to humans ===
M. lamarckii is edible and economically important in China; commercial fishing has greatly disrupted the habitat where it lives. It is a filter feeder which primarily feeds on phytoplankton. Its shell is used to make the white stones used in Go.
