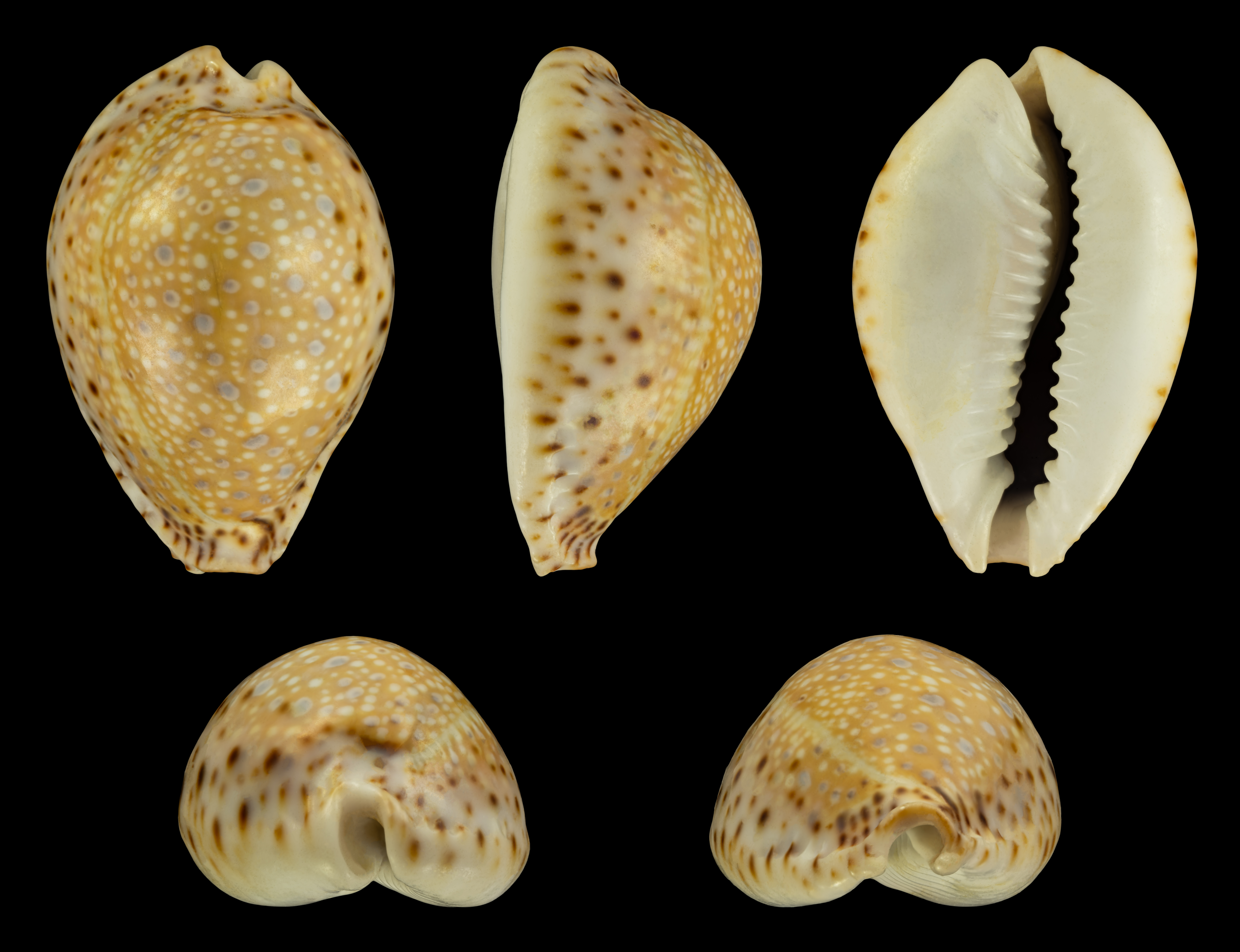
- A shell of Naria lamarckii from Zanzibar

Scientific classification
- Kingdom: Animalia
- Phylum: Mollusca
- Class: Gastropoda
- Subclass: Caenogastropoda
- Order: Littorinimorpha
- Family: Cypraeidae
- Genus: Naria
- Species: N. lamarckii

Binomial name
- Naria lamarckii (Gray, 1825)

Synonyms
- Cypraea lamarcki [sic] (misspelling); Cypraea lamarckii Gray, 1825; Erosaria lamarckii (Gray, 1825); Erosaria lamarckii redimita (Melvill, 1888)

= Naria lamarckii =

Species of gastropod

Naria lamarckii, common name the Lamarck's cowrie, is a species of sea snail, a cowry, a marine gastropod mollusk in the family Cypraeidae, the cowries.

== Description ==
The shells of these common cowries reach on average 37–41 millimetres (1.5–1.6 in) of length, with a minimum size of 18 millimetres (0.71 in) and a maximum size of 51 millimetres (2.0 in). The basic color of the oval-shaped, smooth and shiny shells is ochraceous or fulvous, the dorsum shows a clear longitudinal line and it is ocellated with many whitish small spots, while several chestnut or reddish-brown speckles are present on the edges of both sides. The base is mainly whitish, with a long and wide aperture with several teeth. In the living cowries the mantle is well developed, with external antennae.

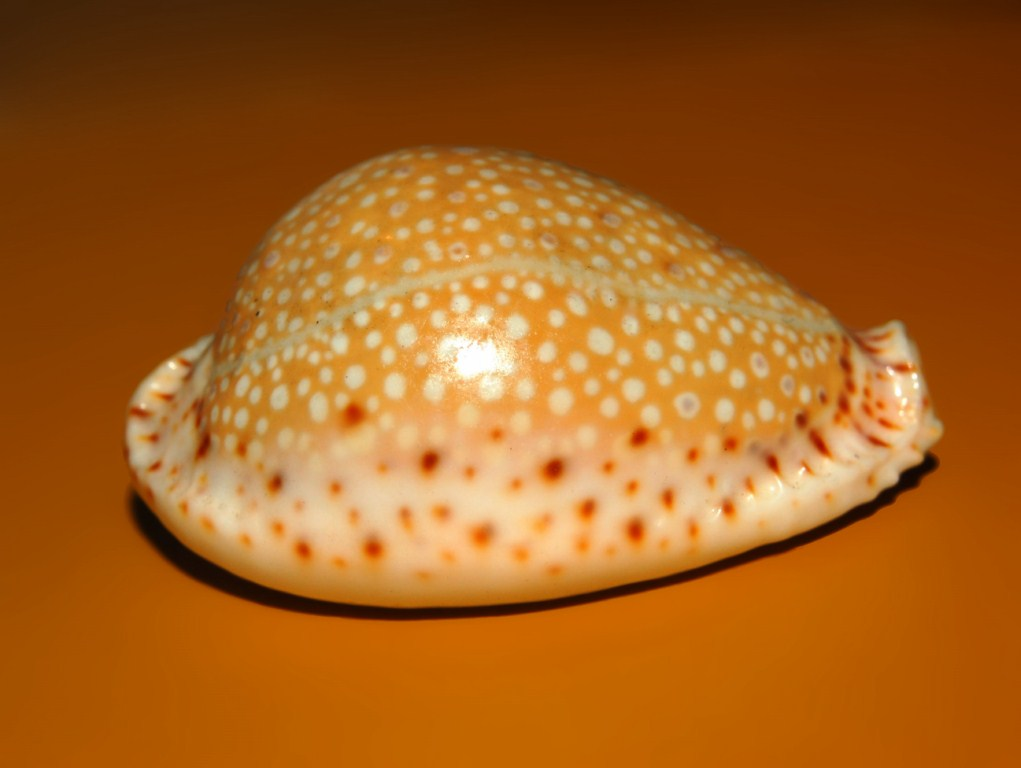
A shell of Naria lamarckii from Philippines, lateral view, anterior end towards the right

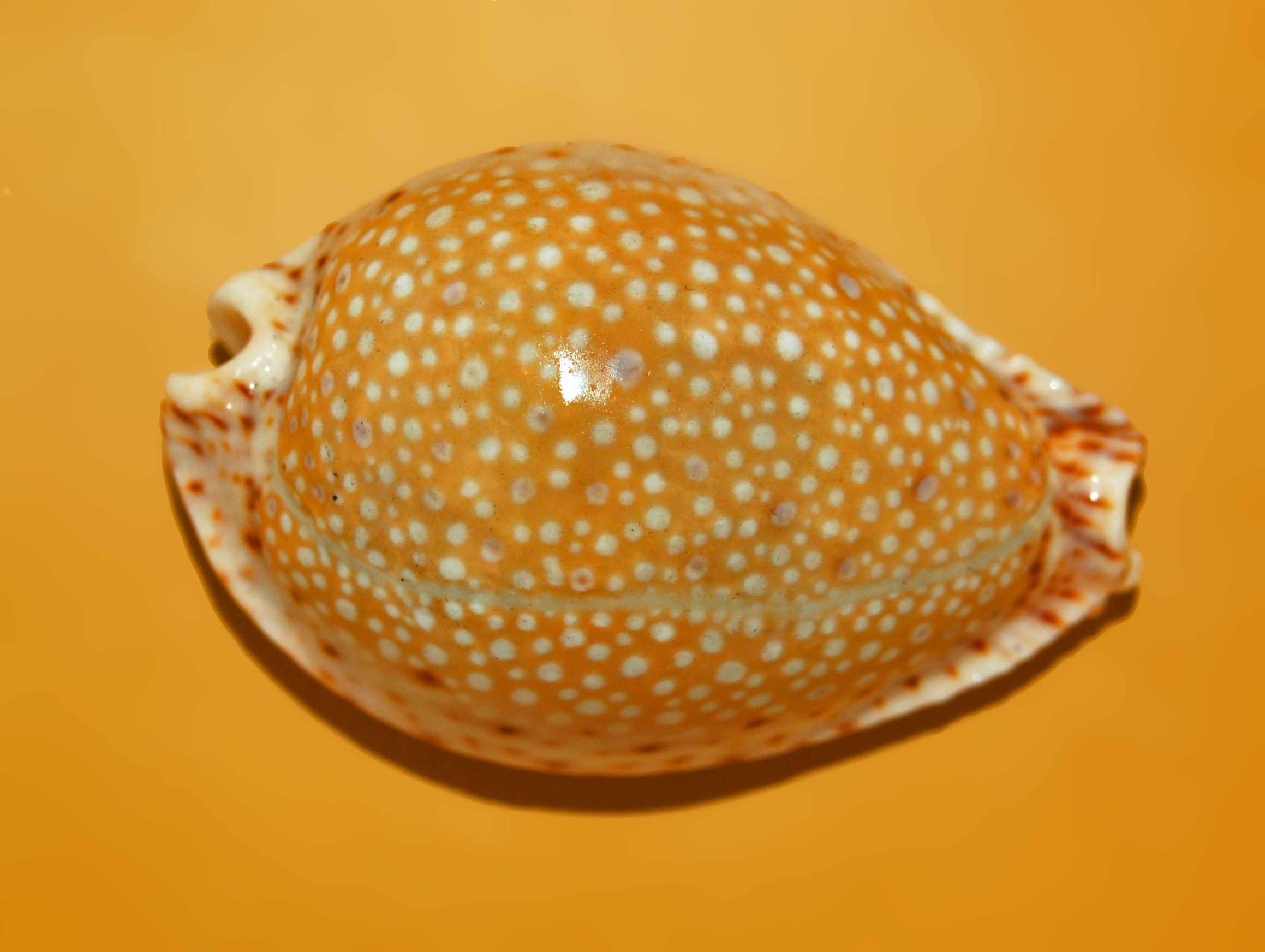
A shell of Naria lamarckii from Philippines, dorsal view, anterior end towards the right

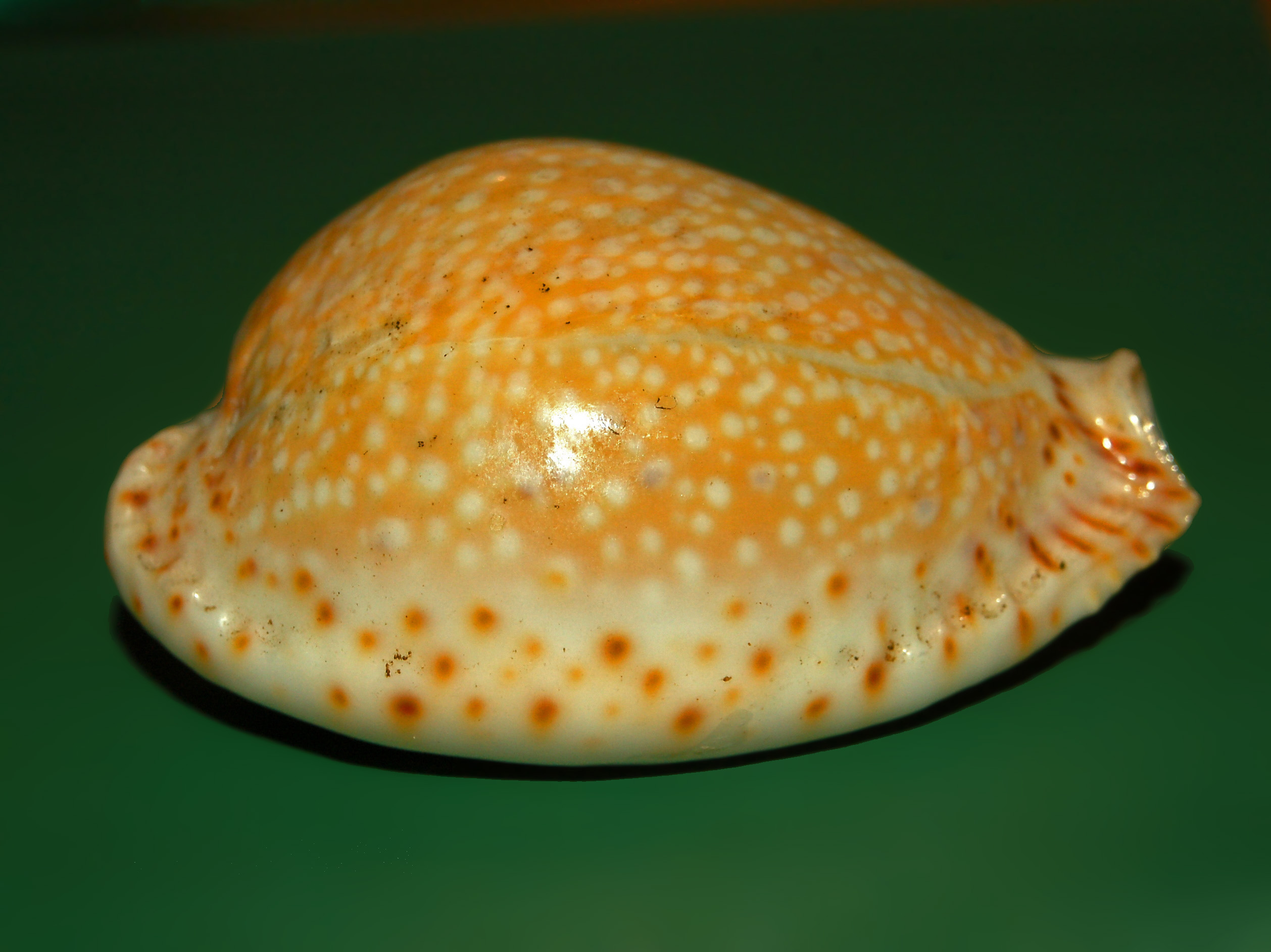
A shell of Naria lamarckii from Zanzibar, lateral view, anterior end towards the right

== Distribution ==
This species is distributed in the East Africa and in the Indian Ocean along Aldabra, Kenya, Madagascar, the Mascarene Basin, Mauritius, Mozambique, Zanzibar, Réunion, the Seychelles, Tanzania, India, Thailand, Singapore, Indonesia and Philippines.

== Habitat ==
Living cowries can be encountered in tropical intertidal water or on coral reef up to about 20 metres (66 ft) of depth. As they fear the light, during the day they usually stay in coral caves or under rocks. At dawn or dusk they start feeding on sponges or coral polyps.

== Subspecies ==
- Naria lamarckii fainzilberi Lorenz & Hubert, 1993

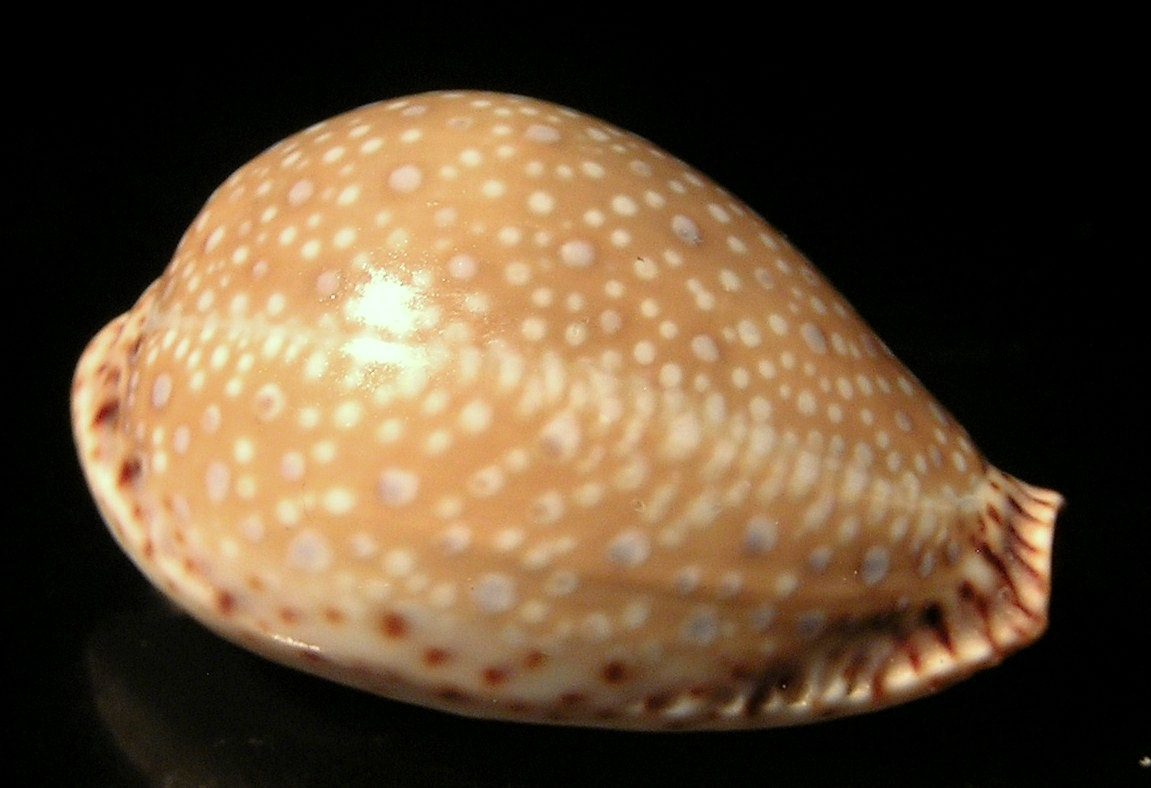
A shell of Naria lamarckii fainzilberi, anterior end towards the right

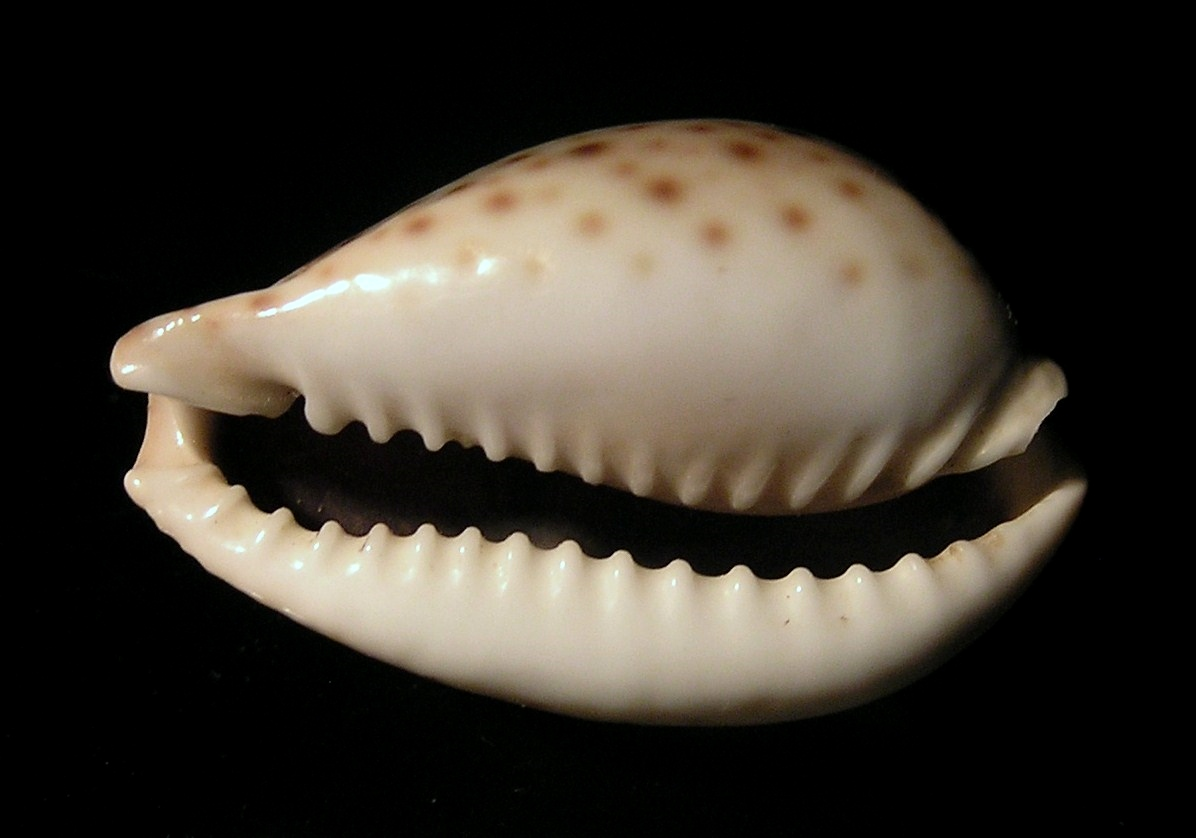
A shell of Naria lamarckii fainzilberi, apertural view, anterior end towards the left

- Naria lamarckii lamarckii (Gray, 1825)
- Naria lamarckii redimita Melvill, 1888
