= List of edible molluscs =

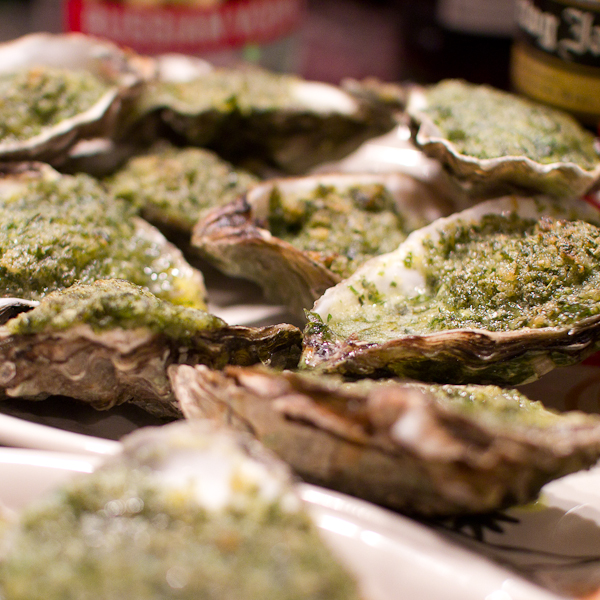
Edible molluscs are used to prepare many different dishes, such as Oysters Rockefeller (pictured)

This is a partial list of edible molluscs. Molluscs are a large phylum of invertebrate animals, many of which have shells. Edible molluscs are harvested from saltwater, freshwater, and the land, and include numerous members of the classes Gastropoda (snails), Bivalvia (clams, scallops, oysters etc.), Cephalopoda (octopus and squid), and Polyplacophora (chitons).

Many species of molluscs are eaten worldwide, either cooked or raw. Some mollusc species are commercially exploited and shipped as part of the international trade in shellfish; other species are harvested, sold and consumed locally. Some species are collected and eaten locally but are rarely bought and sold. A few species of molluscs are not commonly eaten now, but were eaten in historical or prehistoric times.

The list is divided into marine and non-marine (terrestrial and freshwater) species, and within those divisions, the lists are primarily arranged taxonomically, so that related species are grouped together.

== Marine species ==
=== Gastropods (snails) ===
These sea snails are edible; some are listed by genus, others by species and others by their common name.

Most species of abalone, including:

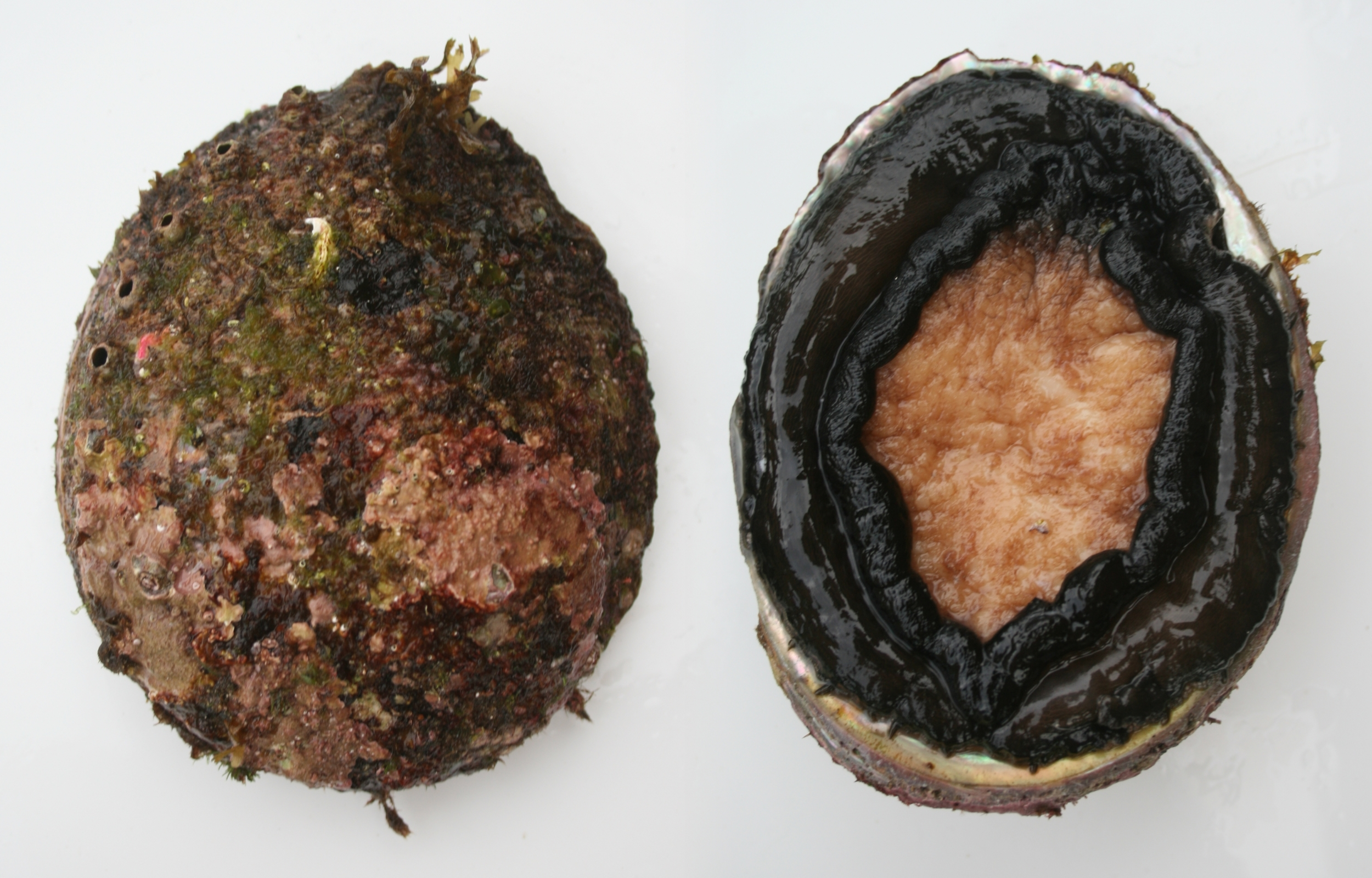
Blacklip abalone

- Abalone
- Black abalone
- Blacklip abalone
- Green abalone
- Green ormer
- Haliotis corrugata
- Red abalone
- White abalone
- Pāua

Many species of true limpets, including:

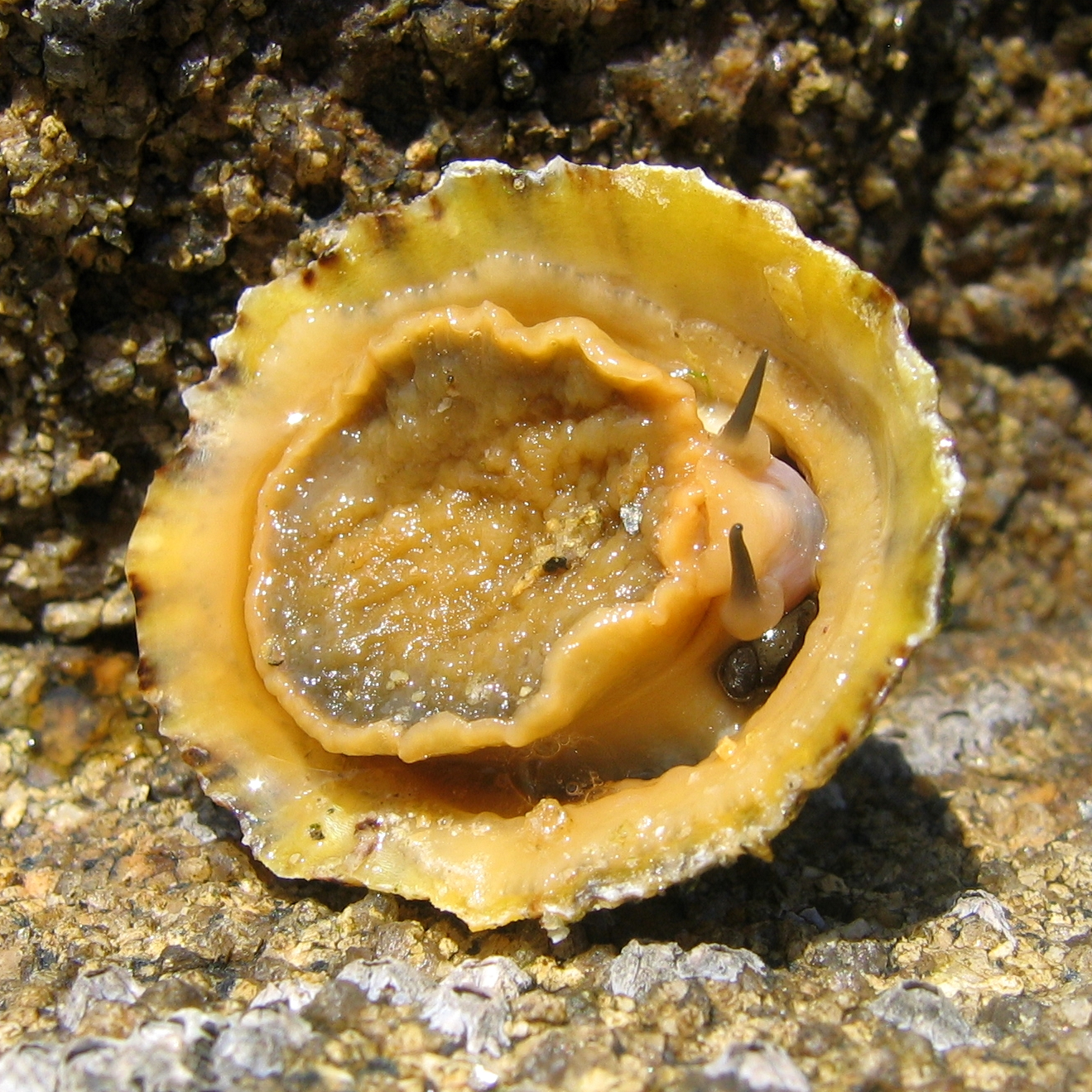
A ventral view of Patella rustica

- Cellana exarata
- Cellana sandwicensis
- Patella caerulea
- Patella ferruginea
- Patella rustica
- Patella ulyssiponensis
- Patella vulgata

Many species of winkles, including:

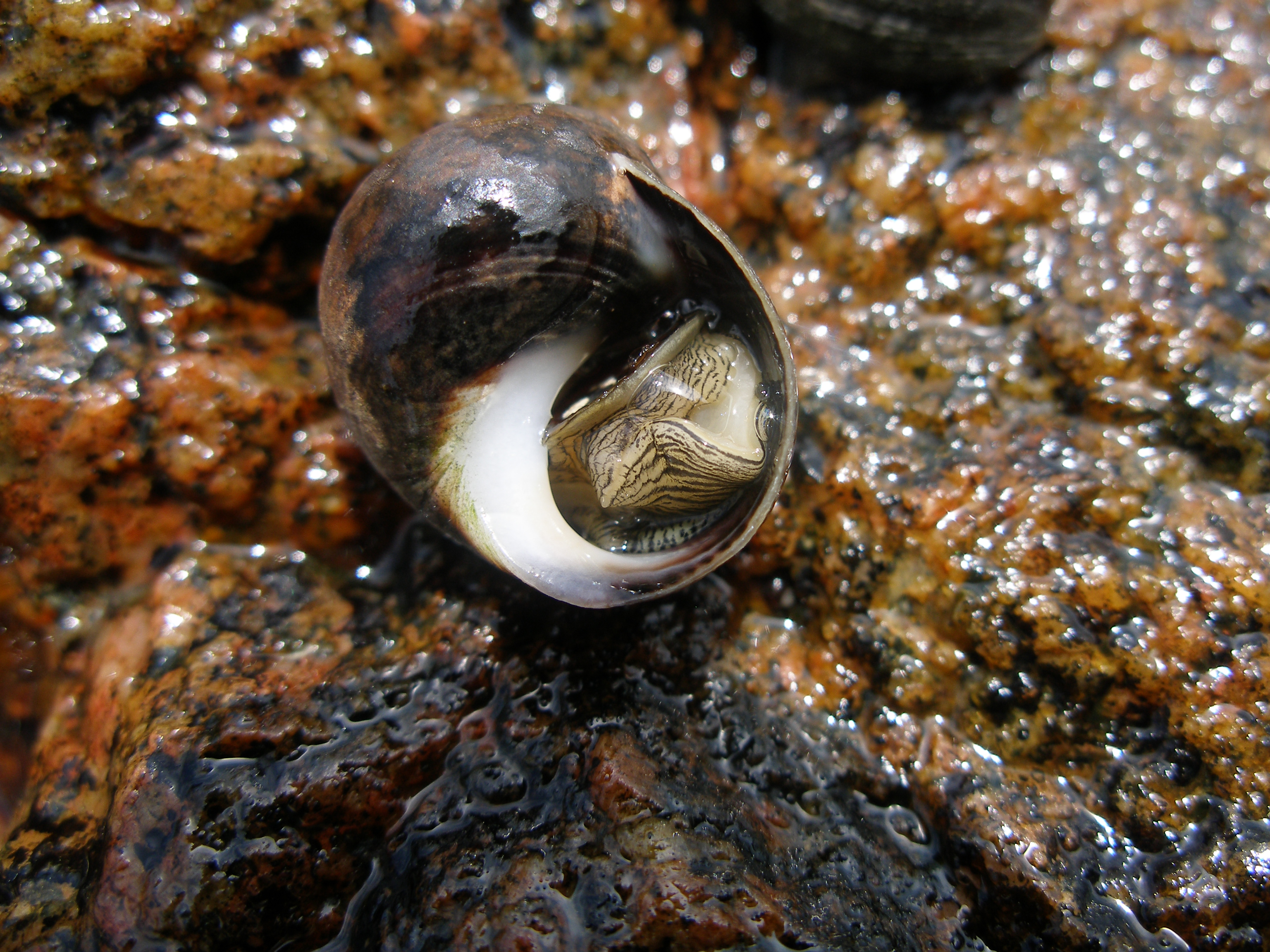
A common periwinkle emerging from its shell

- Austrolittorina antipodum
- Common periwinkle
- Littorina sitkana
- and other species in the family Littorinidae

Many species of conchs, including:

- Lobatus gigas
- Laevistrombus canarium

Some murex species, including:

- Chorus giganteus
- Concholepas concholepas

Some top shell species, including:

- Turbo bruneus
- Turbo cornutus
- Turbo intercostalis
- Turbo sazae
- Tectus niloticus

Many species of whelks, Buccinidae, including:

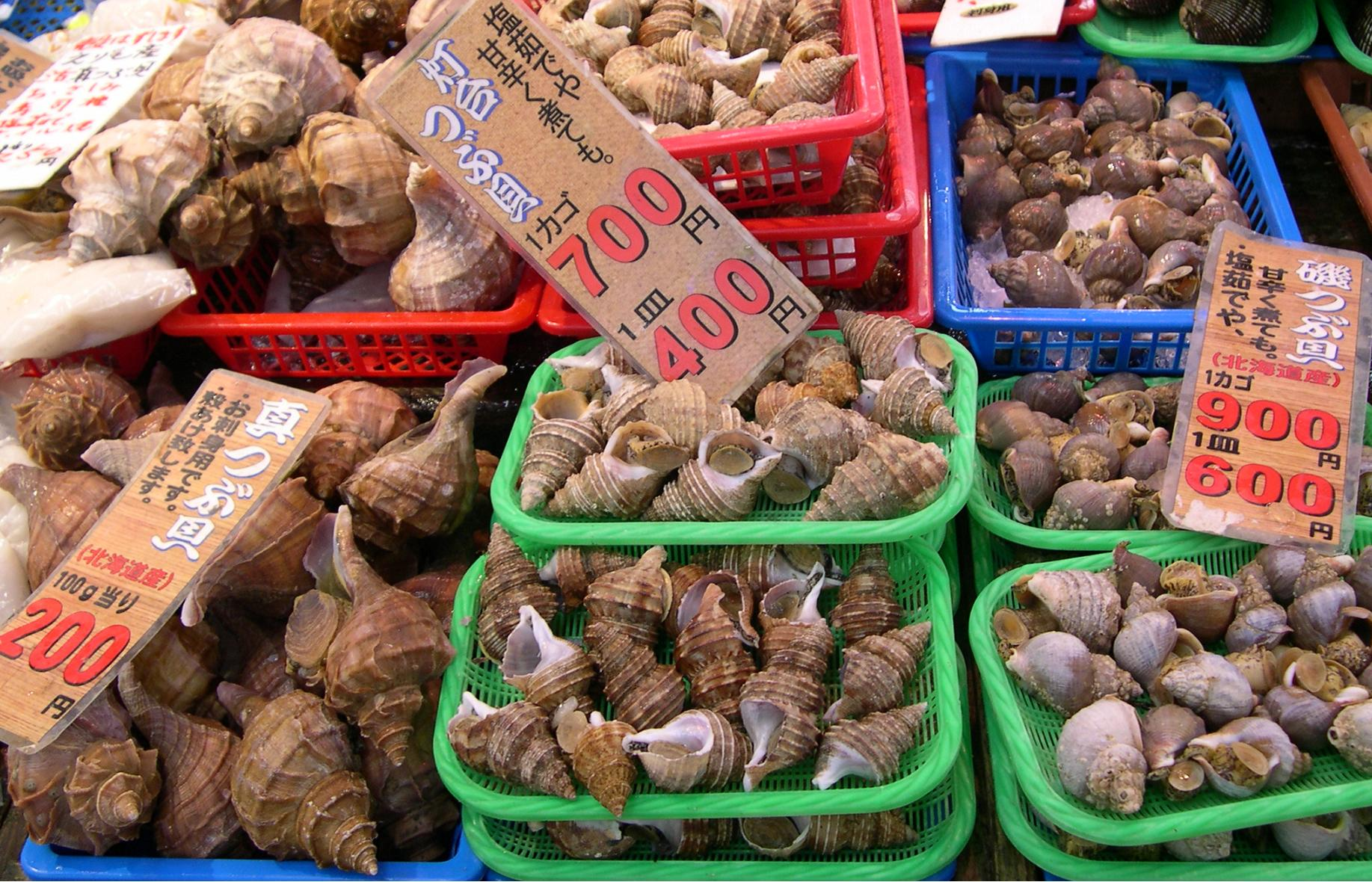
Several different species of large whelks in the family Buccinidae on sale at a fish market in Japan

- Channeled whelk
- Lightning whelk
- Knobbed whelk

Other sea snail groups:

- Bullacta exarata, a bubble snail
- Amphibola crenata, an air-breathing mud snail
- Melo melo a volute snail
- Euspira heros the Northern moon snail

=== Bivalves (clams etc.) ===
Note that the common names of edible bivalves can be misleading, in that not all species known as "cockles" "oysters", "mussels", etc., are closely related.

Ark clams (Arcidae), including:

- Blood cockle
- Senilia senilis

Many species of true mussels, family Mytilidae, including:

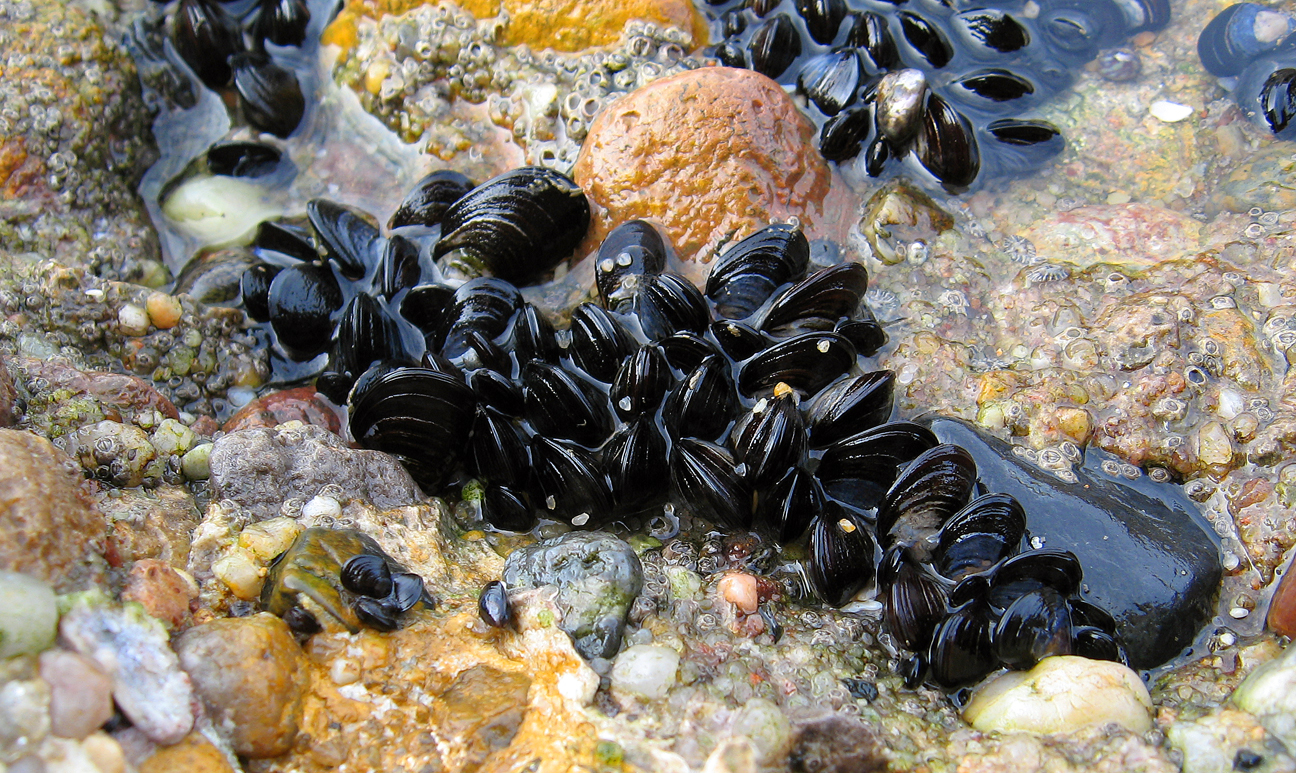
Blue mussels

- Blue mussel
- California mussel
- Mediterranean mussel
- Mytilus coruscus
- Perna canaliculus
- Perna perna
- Perna viridis

Many species of Pen shell including:

- Atrina rigida
- Pinna carnea
- Pinna nobilis

Many species of true oysters, including:

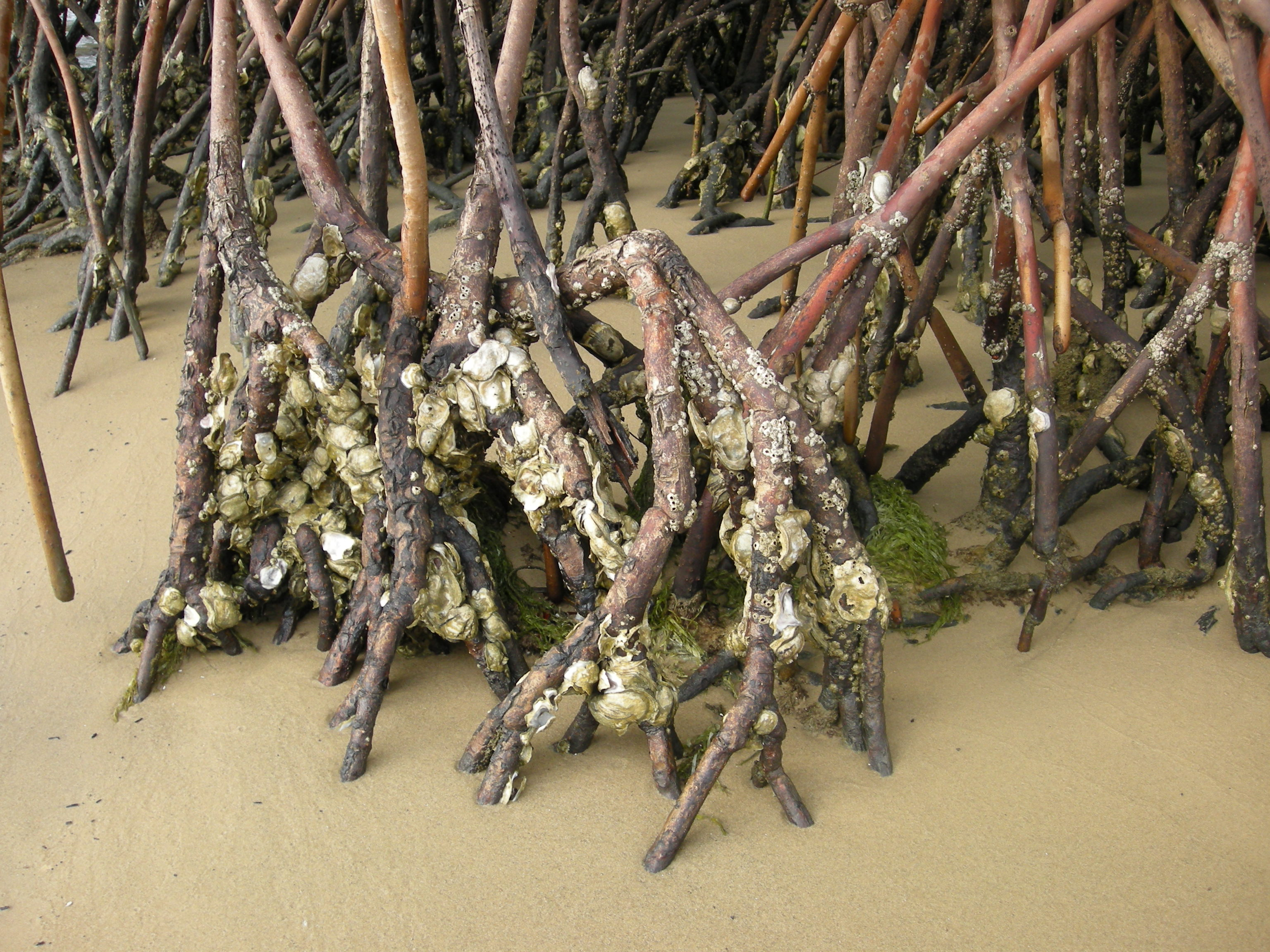
Mangrove oysters on mangrove trees in Carabane

- Auckland oyster
- Dredge oyster
- Mangrove oyster
- Ostrea angasi
- Ostrea edulis
- Pacific oyster
- Rock oysters
  - Saccostrea glomerata (Sydney rock oyster)
  - Saccostrea echinata (Tropical black-lip rock oyster
- Portuguese oyster
- Eastern oyster

Many species of true cockles, including:

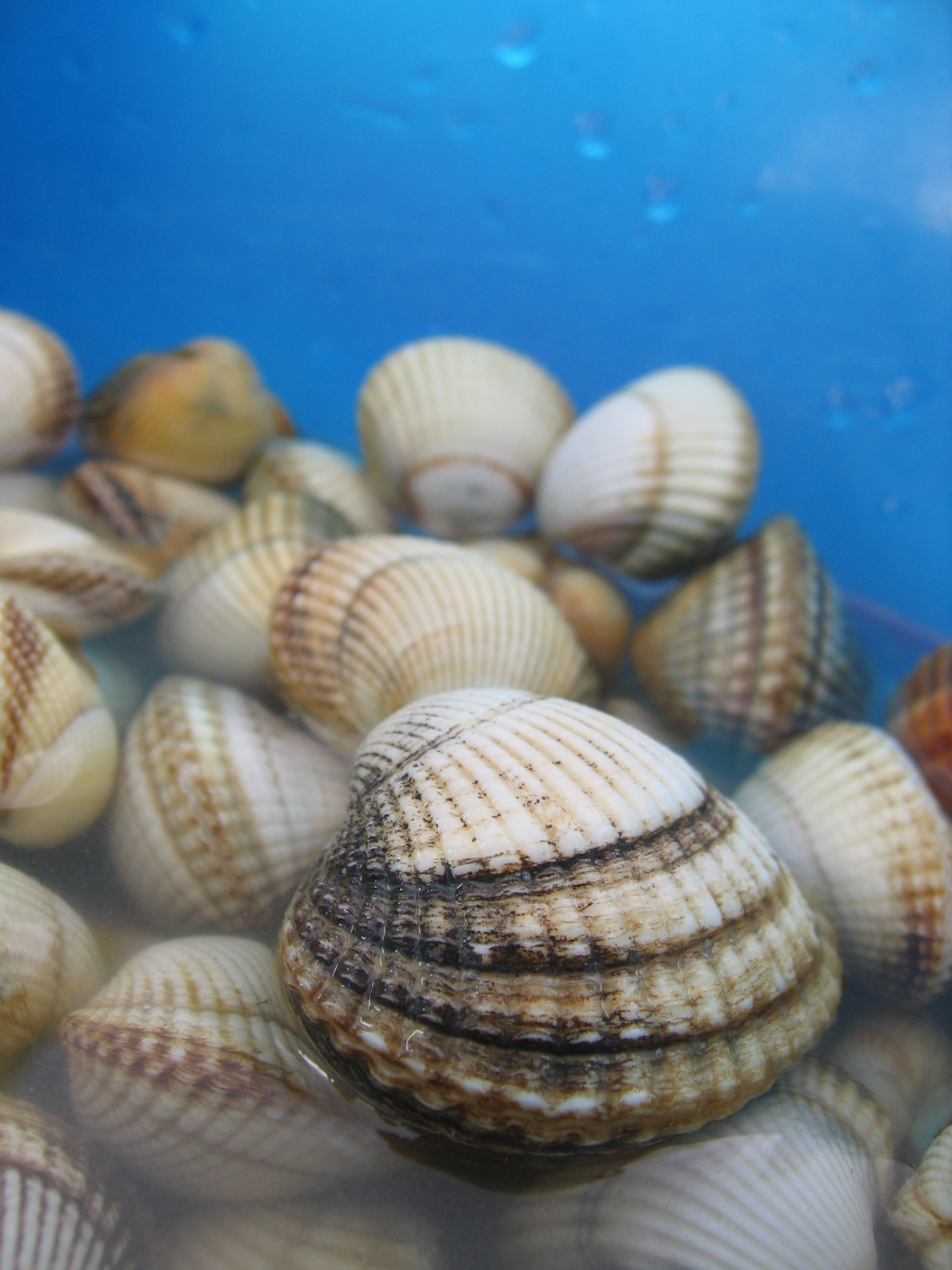
Live cockles

- Clinocardium nuttallii
- Cerastoderma edule
- Dinocardium

Many species of scallop, including:

- Argopecten irradians
- Argopecten purpuratus
- Pecten jacobaeus
- Pecten maximus
- Pecten novaezealandiae
- Placopecten magellanicus

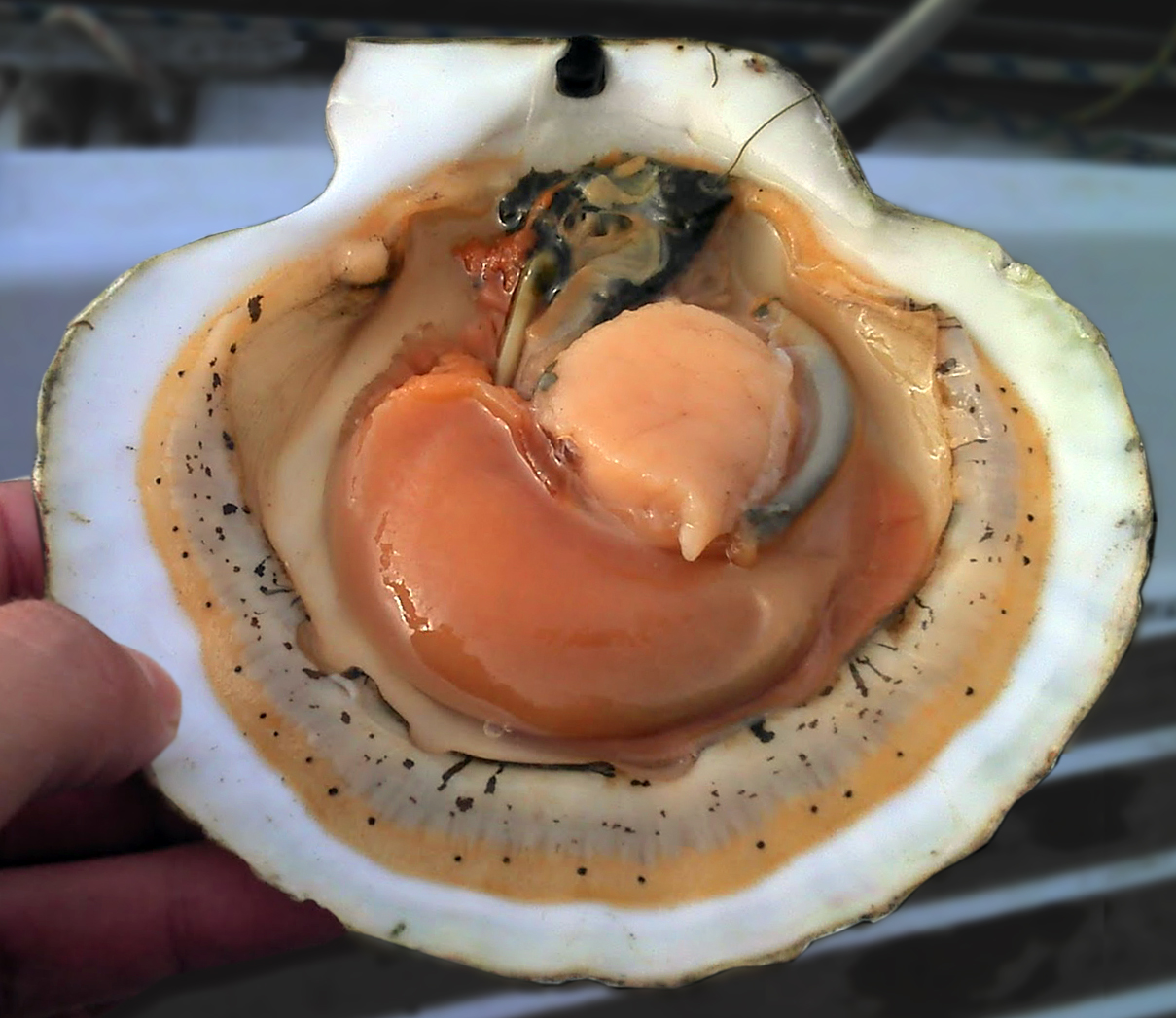
A live opened scallop showing the internal anatomy: The pale orange circular part is the adductor muscle; the darker orange curved part is the "coral", a culinary term for the ovary.

Many species of venus clam, including:

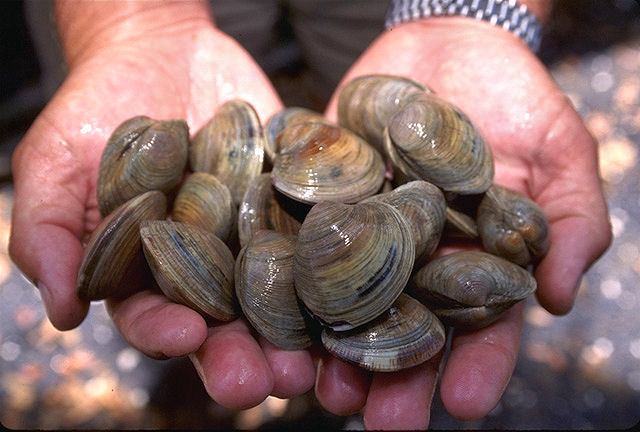
Hard clams

- Austrovenus stutchburyi
- Chione californiensis
- Chione elevata
- Grooved carpet shell
- Northern quahog (Mercenaria mercenaria)
- Southern quahog (Mercenaria campechensis)
- Ruditapes largillierti
- Saxidomus gigantea
- Leukoma
- Saxidomus nuttalli
- Paphies
- Paphies australis
- Pismo clam
- Smooth clam
- Toheroa (Paphies ventricosa)
- Tuatua (Paphies subtriangulata)
- Venerupis philippinarum

Many species in the family Mactridae, including:

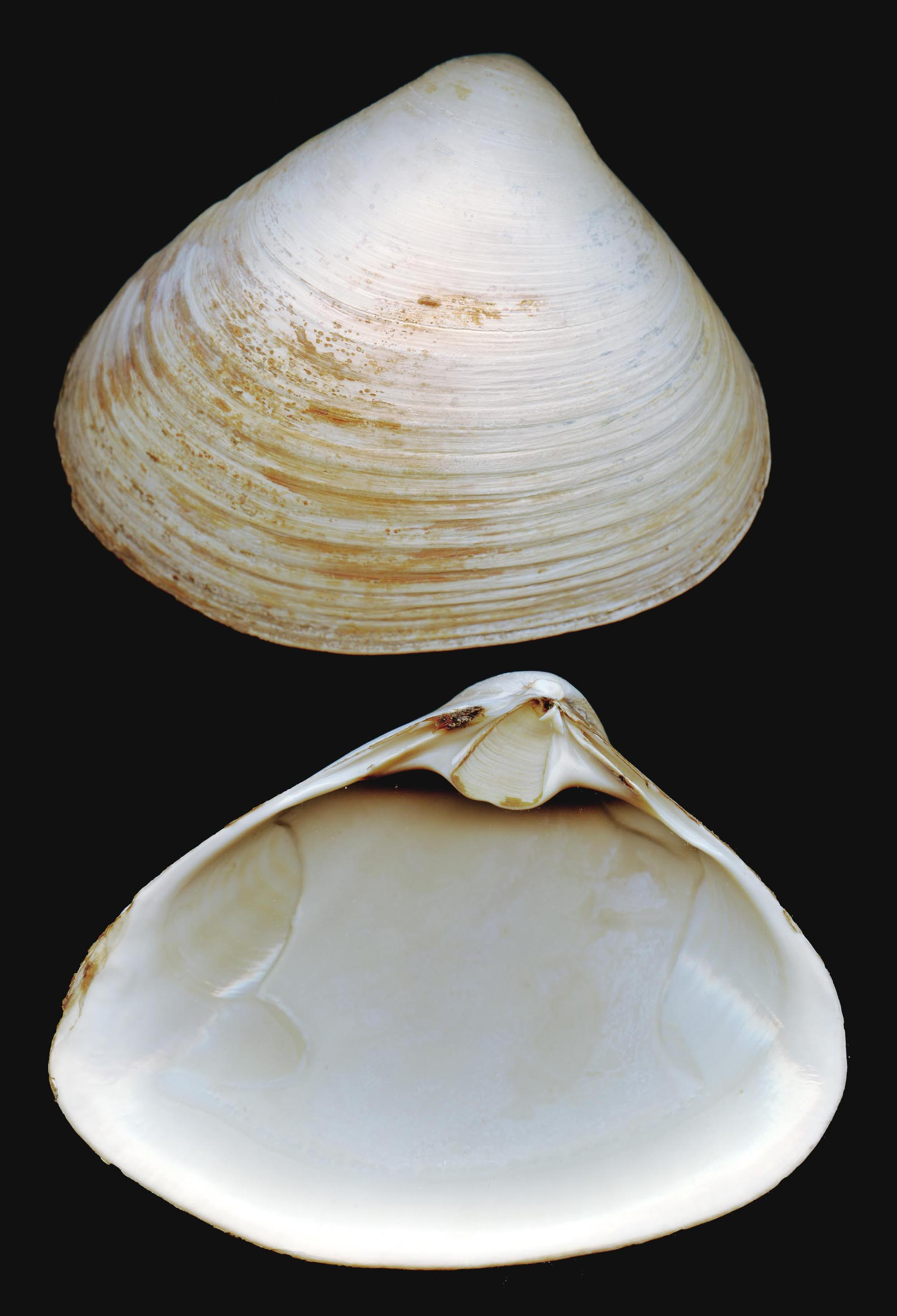
A large shell of Spisula solidissima from Long Beach, Long Island, New York State

- Atlantic surf clam
- Mactra stultorum
- Meretrix
- Meretrix lyrata
- Tresus
- Tresus capax
- Tresus nuttallii
- Spisula aequilateralis

Many species of razor clams Pharidae, including:

- Atlantic jackknife clam
- Ensis
- Ensis macha
- Pacific razor clam
- Pod razor
- Razor shell
- Sinonovacula

Several species of bean clams Donacidae, including:

- Plebidonax deltoides

Other bivalve species, including:

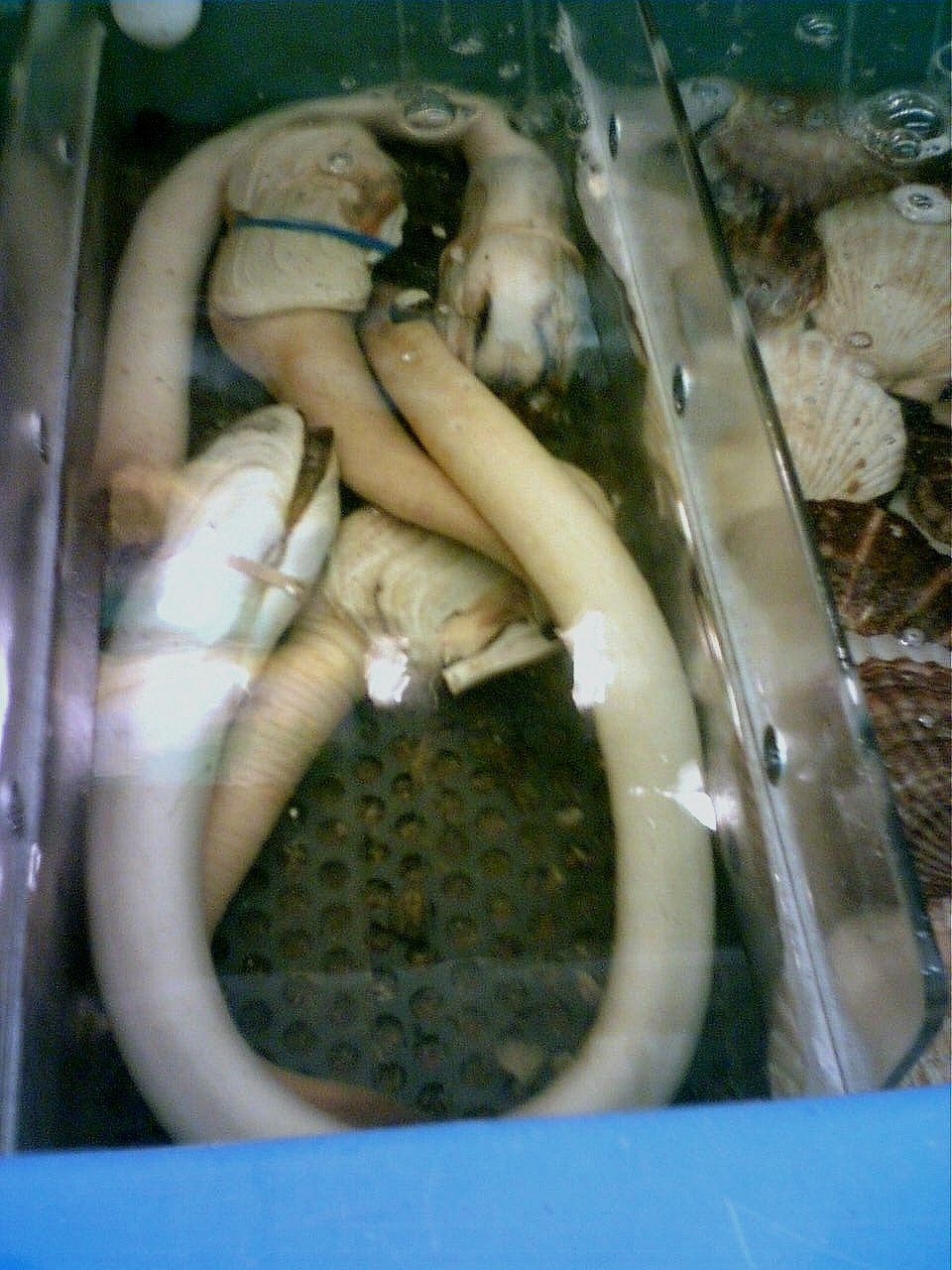
A tank with live geoducks for sale

- Arctica islandica
- Geoduck
- Lithophaga lithophaga
- Mya truncata
- Pholas dactylus
- Placunidae - windowpane oysters, not true oysters
- Pinctada
- Soft-shell clam

=== Chitons (coat of mail shells) ===
- Chiton magnificus
- Gumboot chiton
- Katharina tunicata
- West Indian fuzzy chiton

=== Cephalopods (octopus, squid etc.) ===
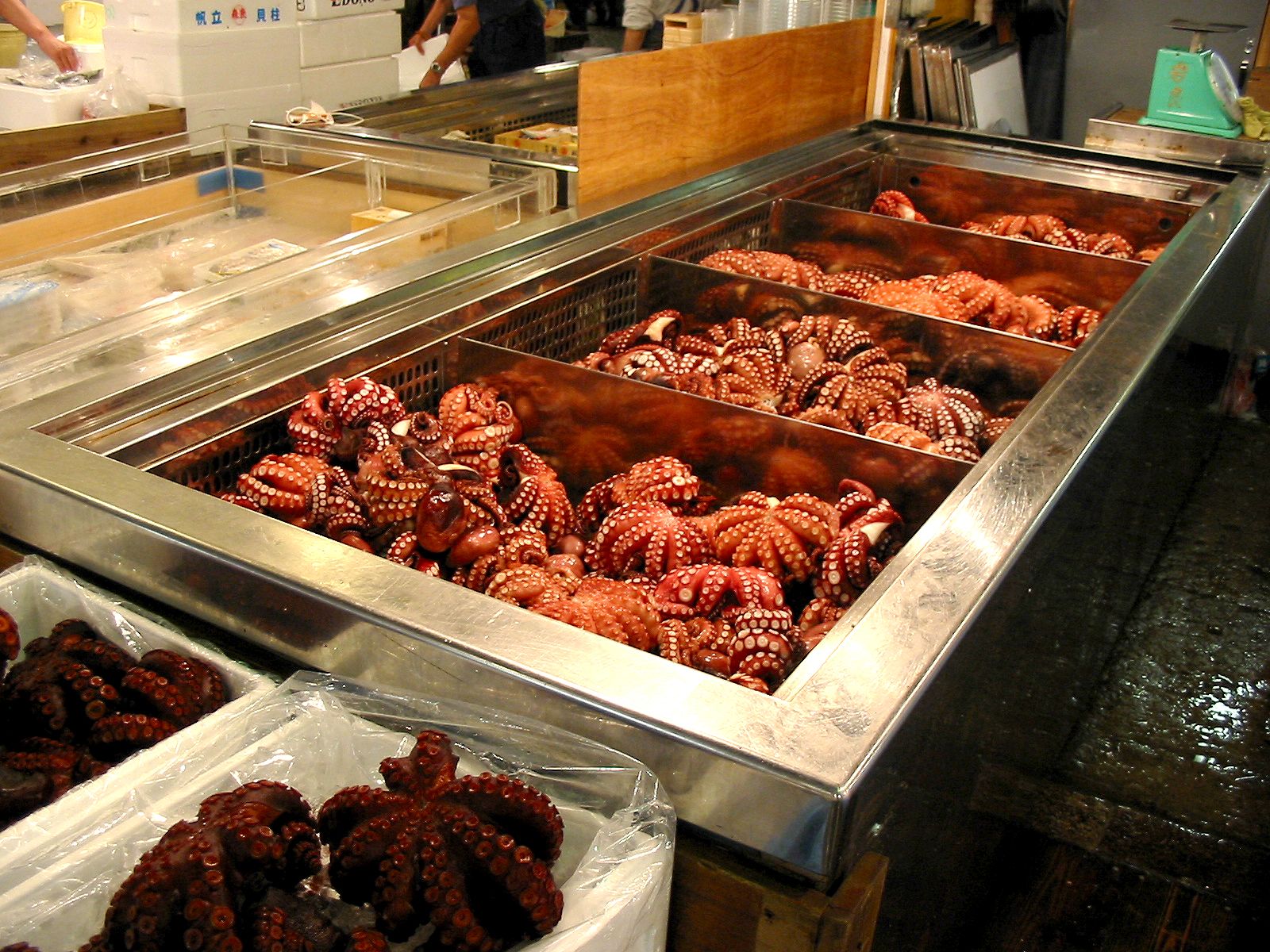
Cooked octopus for sale at Tsukiji fish market

Many species of octopus including:

- Amphioctopus fangsiao
- Bathypolypus valdiviae
- Enteroctopus dofleini
- Enteroctopus megalocyathus
- Octopus cyanea
- Octopus macropus

Many species of squid are used as food, including:

- Humboldt squid
- Japanese flying squid
- longfin inshore squid
- veined squid
- European squid

Some species of cuttlefish are eaten:

- Sepiadarium kochi
- Sepiella inermis

Other cephalopods:

- Nautilus

== Non-marine species ==
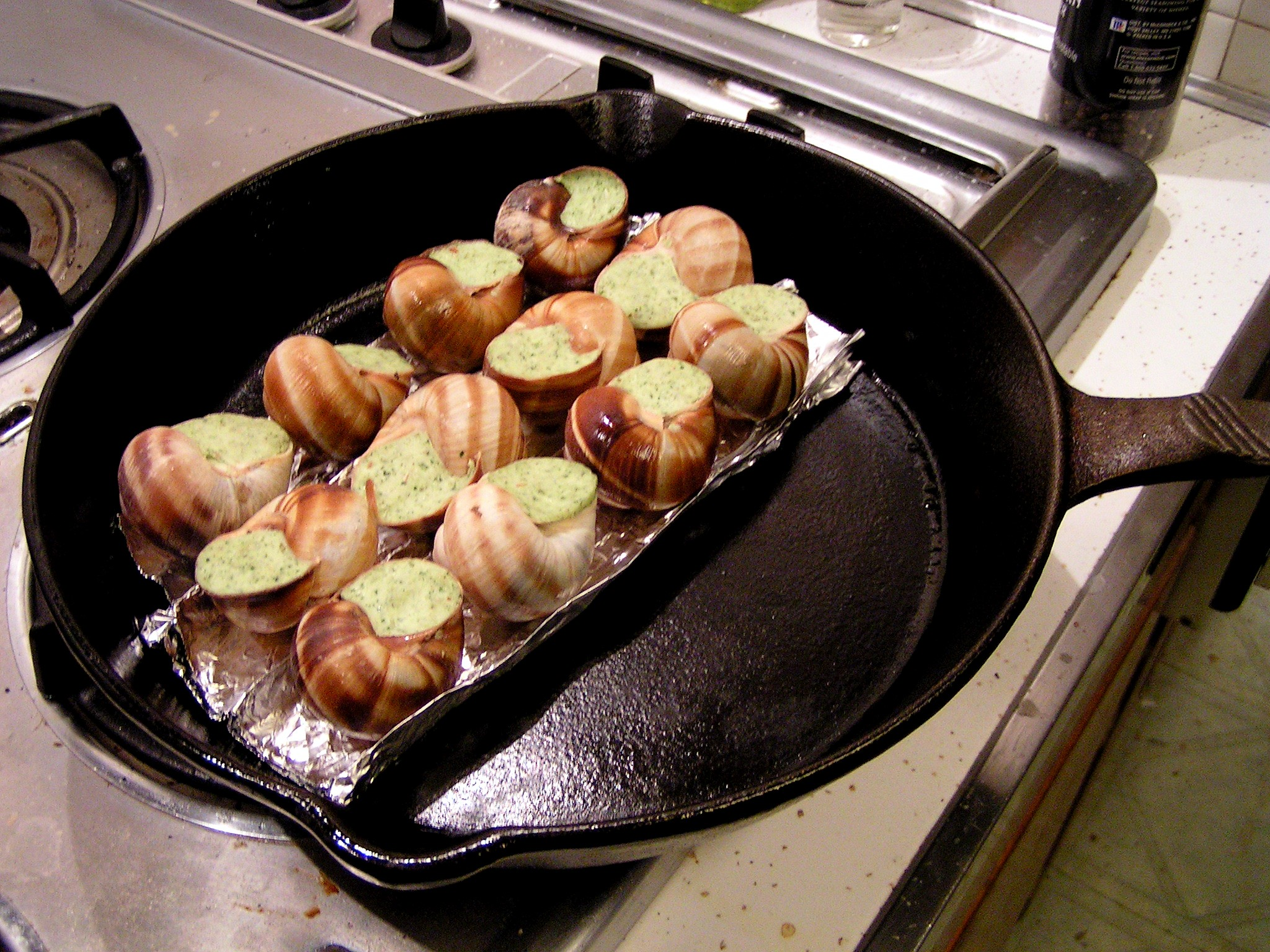
Cooking escargot

Edible freshwater and land mollusc species include freshwater snails, clams, mussels and land snails:

=== Land snails ===
- Escargot
- Cornu aspersum
- Helix lucorum
- Helix nucula
- Helix pomatia
- grove snail

=== Freshwater clams ===
- Corbicula fluminea

== See also ==
- Consider the Oyster
- List of seafood dishes
- Mollusca – uses by humans
- Oyster bar
- Oyster farming
- Oyster festival
