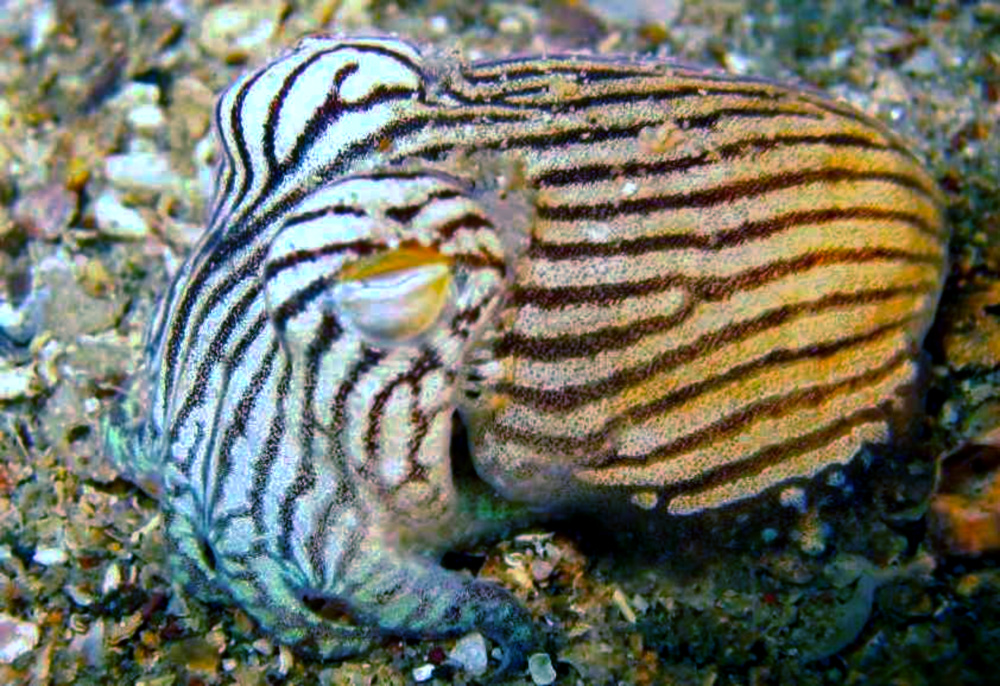
- Sepioloidea lineolata, the Striped Pyjama Squid

Scientific classification
- Kingdom: Animalia
- Phylum: Mollusca
- Class: Cephalopoda
- Order: Sepiolida
- Superfamily: Sepioloidea
- Family: Sepiadariidae; Fischer, 1882 in 1880-1887

Genera
- Sepiadarium; Sepioloidea

= Sepiadariidae =

Family of cephalopods

Sepiadariidae is a family of coleoid cephalopods in the order Sepiolida.

== Classification ==
- Genus Sepiadarium
  - Sepiadarium auritum
  - Sepiadarium austrinum, southern bottletail squid
  - Sepiadarium gracilis
  - Sepiadarium kochi, tropical bottletail squid
  - Sepiadarium nipponianum
- Genus Sepioloidea
  - Sepioloidea jaelae
  - Sepioloidea lineolata, striped pyjama squid
  - Sepioloidea magna
  - Sepioloidea pacifica, Pacific bobtail squid
  - Sepioloidea virgilioi
