= Sepiadarium =

Scientific classification
- Kingdom: Animalia
- Phylum: Mollusca
- Class: Cephalopoda
- Order: Sepiolida
- Family: Sepiadariidae
- Genus: Sepiadarium; Steenstrup, 1881

Type species
- Sepiadarium kochii Steenstrup, 1881

Species
- See text

Genus of cephalopods

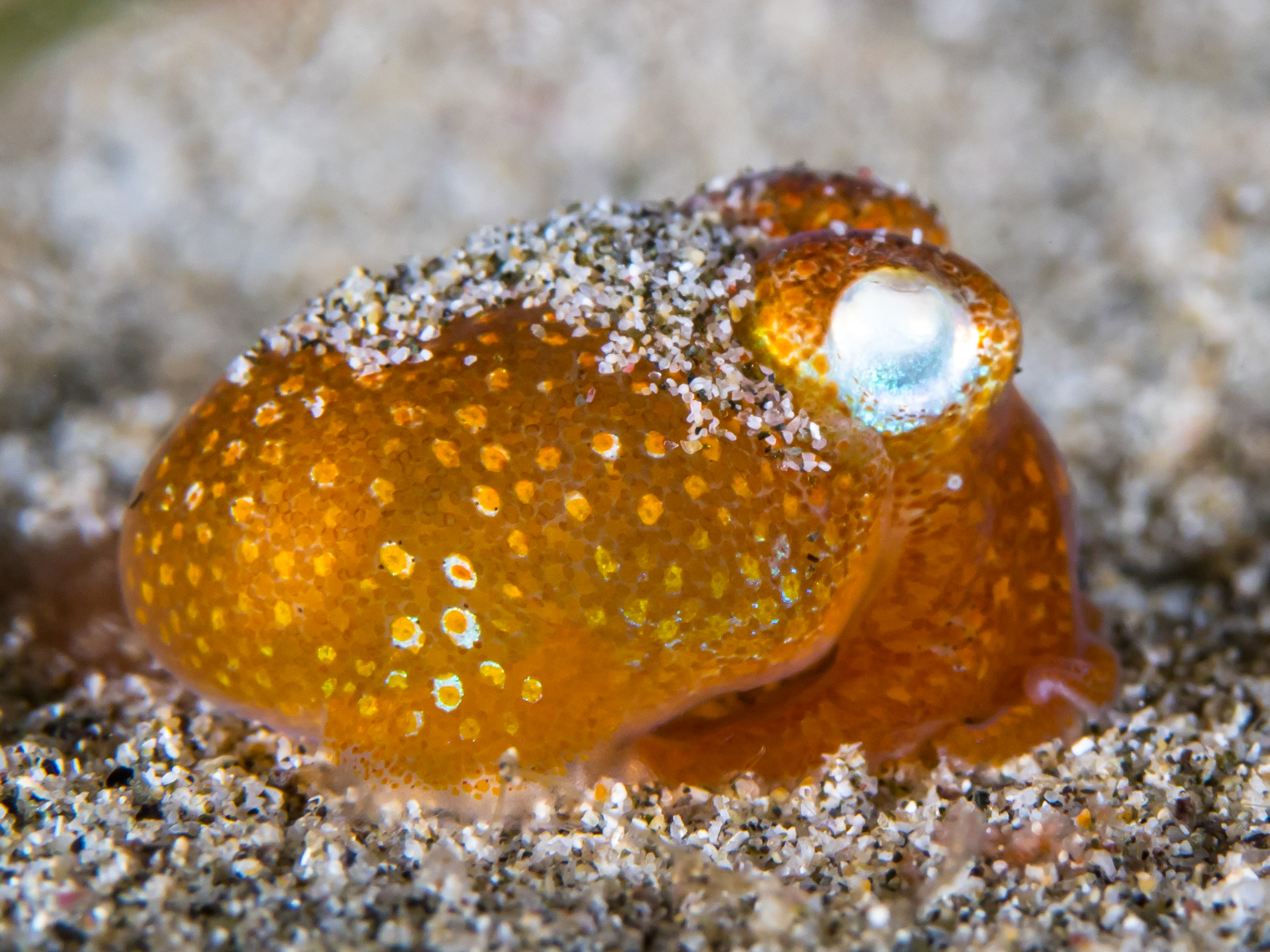
Tropical bottletail squid (Sepiadanum kochi), Morotai, Indonesia

Sepiadarium is a genus of cephalopods comprising five species.

== Species ==
- Sepiadarium auritum Robson, 1914
- Sepiadarium austrinum Berry, 1921, southern bottletail squid
- Sepiadarium gracilis Voss, 1962
- Sepiadarium kochi Steenstrup, 1881, tropical bottletail squid
- Sepiadarium nipponianum Berry, 1932
