= Sepiadarium gracilis =

Conservation status
- Data Deficient (IUCN 3.1)

Scientific classification
- Kingdom: Animalia
- Phylum: Mollusca
- Class: Cephalopoda
- Order: Sepiolida
- Family: Sepiadariidae
- Genus: Sepiadarium
- Species: S. gracilis

Binomial name
- Sepiadarium gracilis Voss, 1962

Species of cephalopod

Sepiadarium gracilis is a species of cephalopod native to the Indo-Pacific; it occurs in the South China Sea and off the western Philippines.

The type specimen was collected in Philippine waters and is deposited at the National Museum of Natural History in Washington, D.C.
