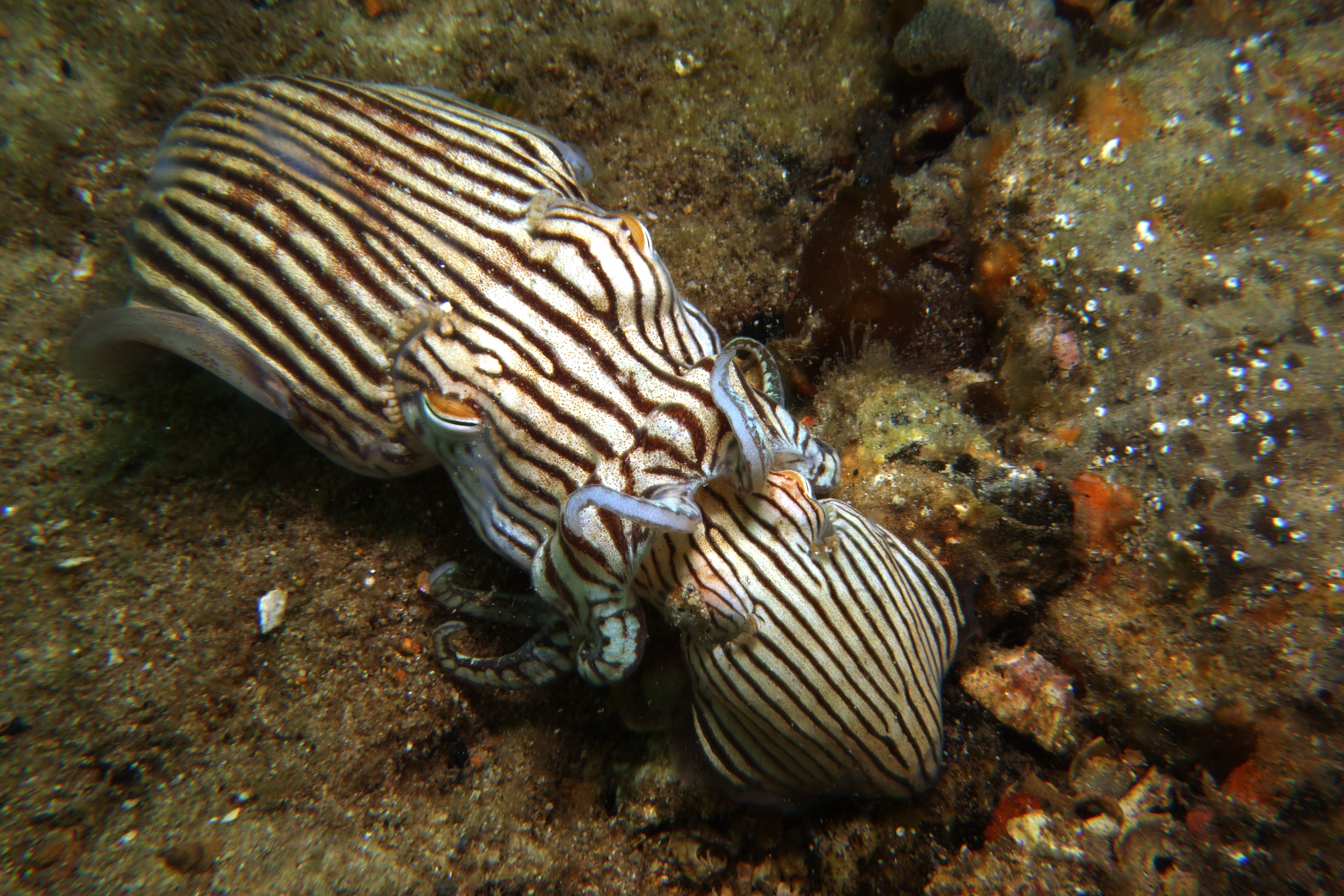

Conservation status
- Data Deficient (IUCN 3.1)

Scientific classification
- Kingdom: Animalia
- Phylum: Mollusca
- Class: Cephalopoda
- Order: Sepiolida
- Family: Sepiadariidae
- Genus: Sepioloidea
- Species: S. lineolata

Binomial name
- Sepioloidea lineolata (Quoy & Gaimard, 1832)

Synonyms
- Sepiola lineolata Quoy & Gaimard, 1832

= Sepioloidea lineolata =

Species of cephalopod

Sepioloidea lineolata or more commonly known as the striped pyjama squid or the striped dumpling squid is a type of bottletail squid that inhabits the Indo-Pacific Oceans of Australia. The striped pyjama squid lives on the seafloor, often hiding in the sand. When fully mature, a striped pyjama squid will only be about 7 to 8 centimetres (2.8 to 3.1 in) in length. Baby striped pyjama squid can be smaller than 10 millimetres (0.39 in).

== Anatomy ==
The striped pyjama squid is able to disguise itself by changing its appearance. The squid will change to a dark brown or purple color when it is being attacked or to camouflage itself with the surrounding environment. Sepioloidea lineolata has two tentacles for feeding and eight arms. The mantle opening on the dorsal side is fringed with finger-like tendrils. They have a maximum mantle length of 40 mm. Like all members of its family, it lacks a shell. The squid's two feeding tentacles have suckers on them with toothed rims.

Sepioloidea lineolata also have glands underneath their body that can secrete a toxic slime whenever the squid is being attacked by a predator. The slime scares off the predators or allows the striped pyjama squid enough time to escape. Another defense mechanism that S. lineolata uses is its inking behavior. The ink that cephalopods produce is made of secretions from two different glands that is colored by melanin. The ink that is expelled can mimic the shape of the squid and thereby distract the predator long enough for the squid to get away, or it can interfere with the vision of the predator.

The striped pyjama squid has white and brown stripes all across its body. The white stripes on the squid are reflective of white light. The dark stripes are actually chromatophores, tiny sacs of pigment that the squid can flash. S. lineolata and other similar cephalopods are toxic, with the venom of their saliva containing tetrodotoxin, a type of neurotoxin.

== Feeding ==
The striped pyjama squid is a predatory animal that feeds on fish, shrimp and crustaceans. During the day, Sepioloidea lineolata will bury itself in the sand to where only the top of its head and its yellow eye are visible. Throughout the day, the squid continues to flick sand particles over its body in order to remain hidden. Because the striped pyjama squid is almost always buried, its pupil is placed dorsally on its body. This also means that Sepioloidea lineolata have high density photoreceptors due to the increased eye movements.

== Parasites ==
The striped pyjama squid has been found to be parasitized by dicyemids. Dicyemids are mesozoans, worm-like parasites that affect the renal appendages on cephalopods that live near the seafloor, like S. lineolata. These dicyemids are also usually host specific. Dicyemids are able to thrive inside the striped pyjama squid because the renal appendages are filled with fluid, which creates the perfect habitat for the parasite. Once inside S. lineolata, the dicyemid will receive its nutrition from the squid's urine.

== Mating and reproduction ==
Sepioloidea lineolata reproduce sexually. In order to mate, a male striped pyjama squid will grasp a female striped pyjama squid and place her to where they are both head-to-head. The male squid then inserts a spermatophore, or a sperm packet, near where the female will store the sperm until she is ready to lay eggs. The male Sepioloidea lineolata can also remove sperm from another male if he detects it in the female. He removes the sperm using a specialized arm shaped like a spoon. Like many species in the order of Sepiida, the male usually dies after mating. The females lay their eggs soon after mating. They lay their eggs in batches or clumps under coral on the seafloor.
