= Sepiadarium auritum =

Conservation status
- Data Deficient (IUCN 3.1)

Scientific classification
- Kingdom: Animalia
- Phylum: Mollusca
- Class: Cephalopoda
- Order: Sepiolida
- Family: Sepiadariidae
- Genus: Sepiadarium
- Species: S. auritum

Binomial name
- Sepiadarium auritum Robson, 1914

Species of cephalopod

Sepiadarium auritum is a species of cephalopod native to the eastern Indian Ocean off north-western Australia.

The type specimen measures 11 mm in mantle length.

The type specimen was collected near Hermite Island, Monte Bello Islands, Western Australia. It is deposited at The Natural History Museum in London.
