= Sepioloidea magna =

Conservation status
- Least Concern (IUCN 3.1)

Scientific classification
- Kingdom: Animalia
- Phylum: Mollusca
- Class: Cephalopoda
- Order: Sepiolida
- Family: Sepiadariidae
- Genus: Sepioloidea
- Species: S. magna

Binomial name
- Sepioloidea magna Reid, 2009

Species of cephalopod

Sepioloidea magna is a species of cephalopod, more precisely a bottletail squid, of the family Sepiadariidae, indigenous to the waters off northern Australia. It was described by Amanda Reid in 2009 from specimens which were found in the Museum and Art Gallery of the Northern Territory in Darwin, Northern Territory. It differs from its congeners in the genus Sepioloidea in its larger size, its modified hectocotylus, the number of tentacular club suckers and the absence of an obvious colour pattern It has been recorded from relatively deep water, between 225m and 300m, in the Arafura Sea north of Darwin, Australia, and south of the eastern Indonesian islands of Tanimbar. Other specimens identified as Sepioloidea and occurring at similar depths, from the North West Shelf, Scott Reef and the Timor Sea probably also represent this species.
