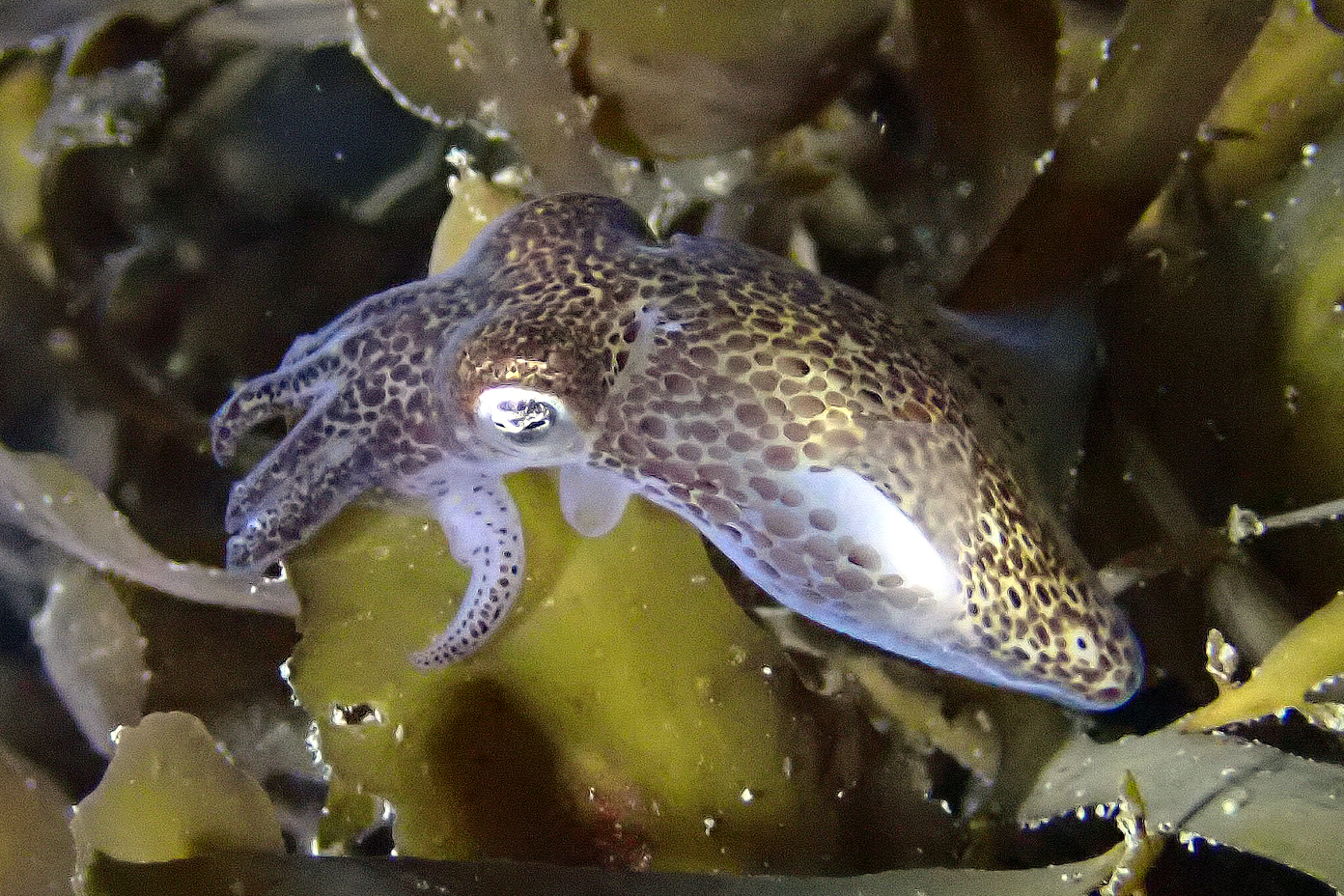
- Sepioloidea pacifica observed in the Wellington Harbour, New Zealand

Conservation status
- Data Deficient (IUCN 3.1)

Scientific classification
- Kingdom: Animalia
- Phylum: Mollusca
- Class: Cephalopoda
- Order: Sepiolida
- Family: Sepiadariidae
- Genus: Sepioloidea
- Species: S. pacifica

Binomial name
- Sepioloidea pacifica (Kirk, 1882)

Synonyms
- Sepiola pacifica Kirk, 1882

= Sepioloidea pacifica =

Species of cephalopod

Sepioloidea pacifica, also known as the Pacific bobtail squid, is a species of cephalopod native to the southern Pacific Ocean; it occurs off New Zealand in the west and in the Nazca and Sala y Gomez submarine ridges in the east.

The type specimen was collected off New Zealand and is deposited at the National Museum of New Zealand in Wellington. Sepioloidea pacifica was first described as a species in 1882 by T.W. Kirk.

== Morphology ==
=== Mantle ===
Male mantles can grow up to 19 mm in length, and female mantles can grow up to 26 mm in length.

=== Suckers ===
Sepioloidea pacifica have rows of 5 biserial suckers, with the largest suckers closer to the edge of the arms.
