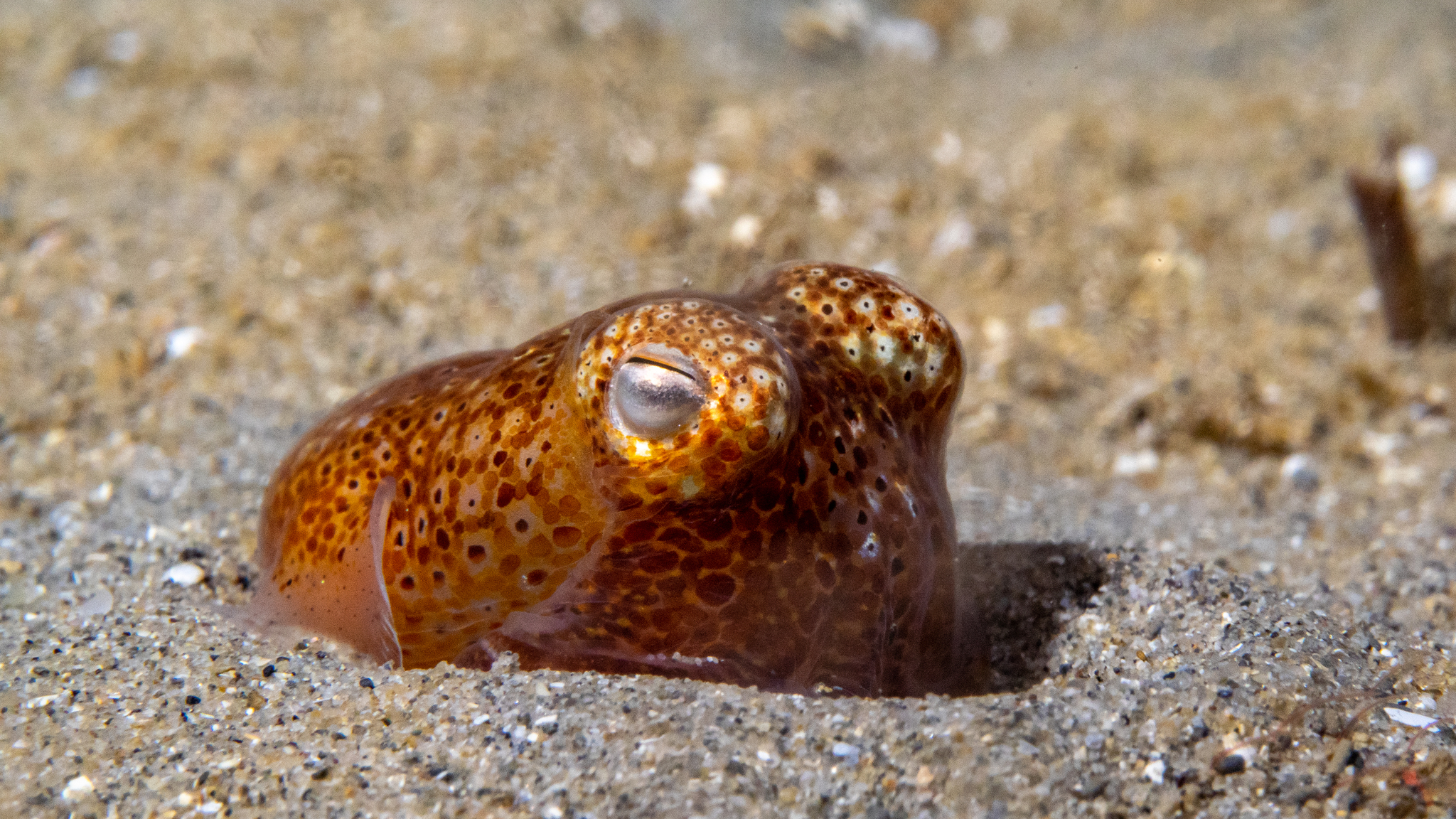

Conservation status
- Data Deficient (IUCN 3.1)

Scientific classification
- Kingdom: Animalia
- Phylum: Mollusca
- Class: Cephalopoda
- Order: Sepiolida
- Family: Sepiadariidae
- Genus: Sepiadarium
- Species: S. austrinum

Binomial name
- Sepiadarium austrinum Berry, 1921

= Sepiadarium austrinum =

Species of cephalopod

Sepiadarium austrinum, the southern bottletail squid, is a species of cephalopod in the genus Sepiadarium. It was first described by S. Stillman Berry in 1921 based on a specimen found in St. Vincent Bay in South Australia.

== Description ==
Sepiadarium austrinum is very small and round, with kidney-shaped fins on the back third of its body. It has a mantle length of up to three centimeters and a total length of up to four centimeters. It can be transparent, yellow, or orange, with egg-shaped white leucophores. S. austrinum has ten arms and tentacles with nine or ten rows of suckers on each arm.

== Distribution ==
Sepiadarium austrinum is found in the southern Indo-Pacific in southern Australia, with a small population in the Spencer Gulf. They are mostly found in sandy habitats in shallow, sheltered waters at depths up to 65 meters.

== Behavior ==
Sepiadarium austrinum buries itself in the sand during the day and feeds at night. It is able to produce slime when threatened.

== Diet ==
Sepiadarium austrinum is carnivorous. It feeds in the sand and near seagrass beds. Its diet is mostly composed of small fish and crustaceans, including amphipods and especially benthic isopods.

== Reproduction ==
Sepiadarium austrinum reproduce from a young age; immature females can also store sperm. Individuals mate with multiple partners. Mating is initiated by males and there is no observed courtship behavior. Males pass sperm packages to the female, who stores them in a pouch below her mouth. Males can also use a special arm to remove the sperm of other males from the pouch. Females can also remove sperm from the pouch, and regularly consume spermatophores. They fertilize eggs by passing them over the pouch. Clumps of eggs are covered in sand and attached to seaweed or seagrass.

== Life cycle ==
Sepiadarium austrinum is an annual species. Juveniles settle quickly after hatching.

== Relationship to humans ==
Sepiadarium austrinum survives well in aquariums, which may make them of commercial interest. They may bite when handled.
