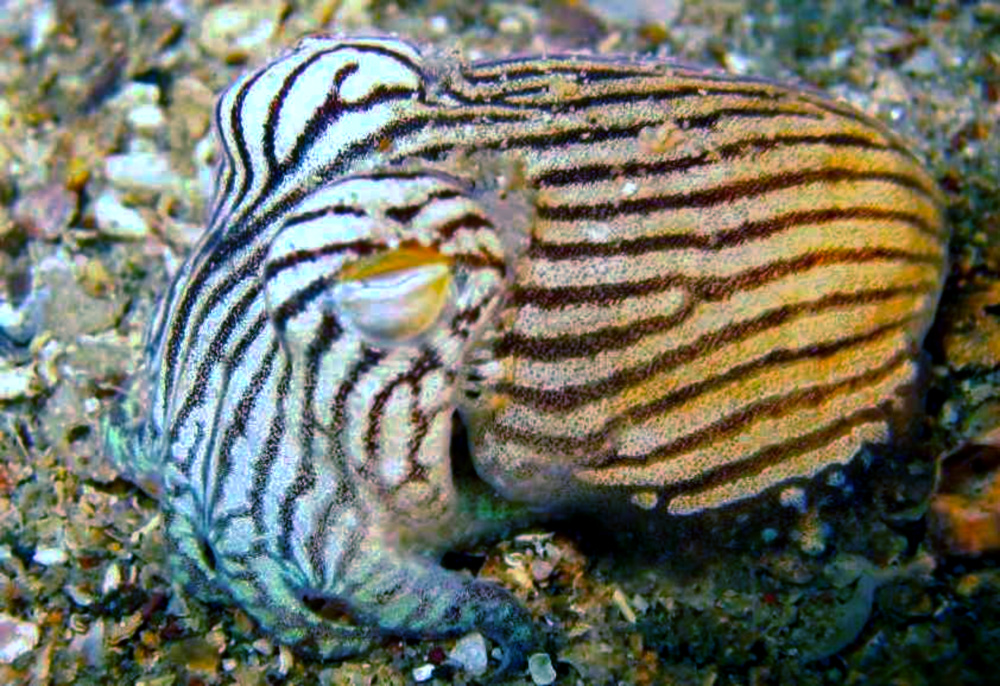
- Sepioloidea lineolata

Scientific classification
- Kingdom: Animalia
- Phylum: Mollusca
- Class: Cephalopoda
- Order: Sepiolida
- Family: Sepiadariidae
- Genus: Sepioloidea; Orbigny, 1845

Type species
- Sepiola lineolata Quoy & Gaimard, 1832

Species
- See text.

= Sepioloidea =

Genus of cephalopods

Sepioloidea is a genus of cephalopods comprising five species.

== Species ==
- Sepioloidea jaelae J. M. Santos, Bolstad & Braid, 2022
- Sepioloidea lineolata (Quoy & Gaimard, 1832), striped pyjama squid
- Sepioloidea magna Reid, 2009
- Sepioloidea pacifica (Kirk, 1882), Pacific bobtail squid
- Sepioloidea virgilioi J. M. Santos, Bolstad & Braid, 2022
