= Sepiadarium nipponianum =

Conservation status
- Data Deficient (IUCN 3.1)

Scientific classification
- Kingdom: Animalia
- Phylum: Mollusca
- Class: Cephalopoda
- Order: Sepiolida
- Family: Sepiadariidae
- Genus: Sepiadarium
- Species: S. nipponianum

Binomial name
- Sepiadarium nipponianum Berry, 1932

Species of cephalopod

Sepiadarium nipponianum is a species of cephalopod native to the western Pacific Ocean; it occurs off the Japanese islands of Shikoku, Kyūshū, and southern Honshū.

The type specimen was collected off Japan and is deposited at the National Museum of Natural History in Washington, D.C.
