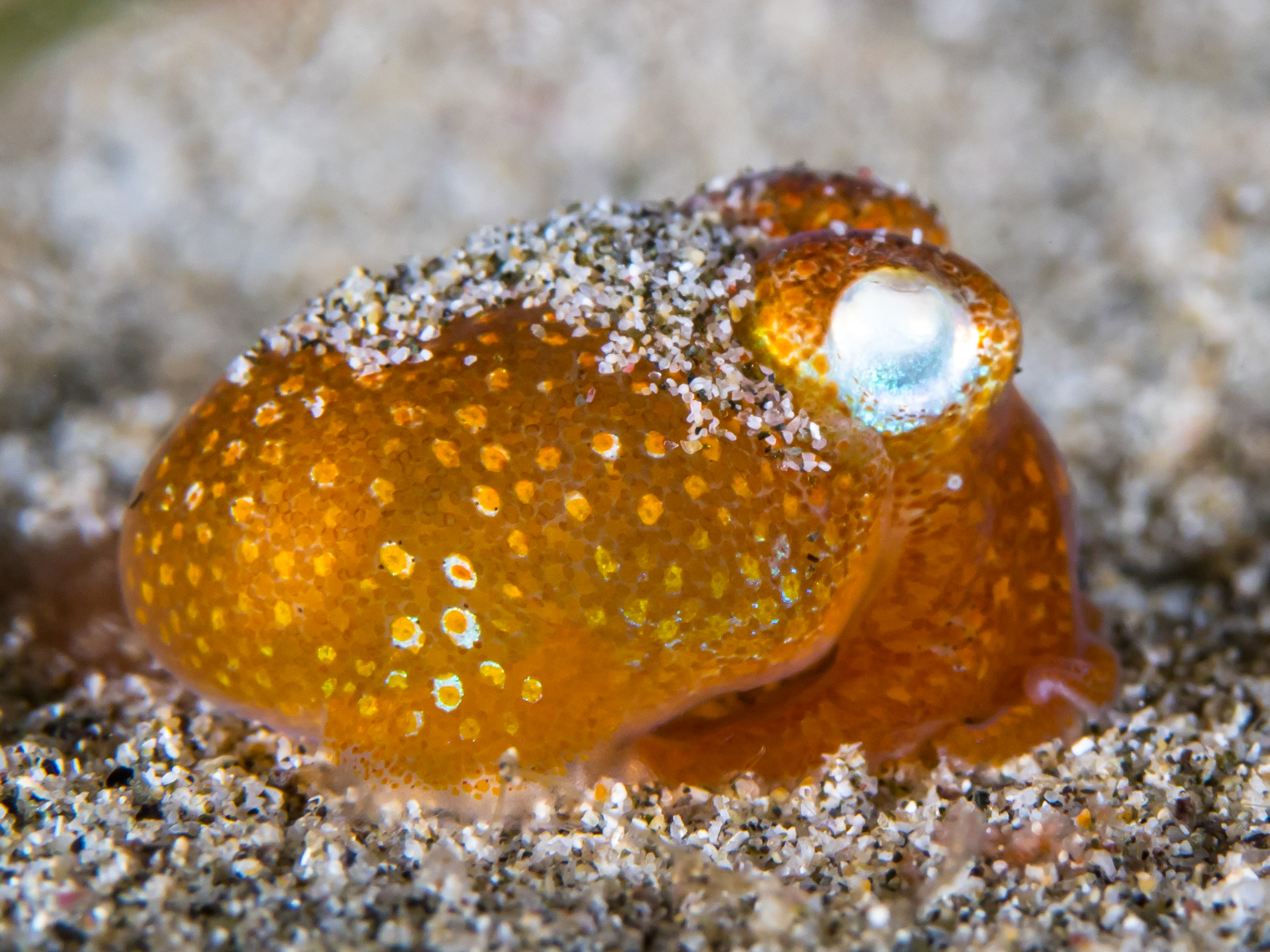

Conservation status
- Least Concern (IUCN 3.1)

Scientific classification
- Kingdom: Animalia
- Phylum: Mollusca
- Class: Cephalopoda
- Order: Sepiolida
- Family: Sepiadariidae
- Genus: Sepiadarium
- Species: S. kochi

Binomial name
- Sepiadarium kochi Steenstrup, 1881

Synonyms
- Sepiadarium malayense G. C. Robson, 1932

= Sepiadarium kochi =

Species of cephalopod

Sepiadarium kochi, common name tropical bottletail squid or Koch's bottletail squid, is a species of cephalopod.

== Description ==
This species grows to a maximum mantle length of approximately 3 cm with total size being around 10 cm. Sepiadarium kochi has both chromatophores (red-brown) and leucophores (white) similarly to other cuttlefish which gives this species in particular an orange tint.

== Distribution and habitat ==
Sepiadarium kochi is found in the Indo-West Pacific from India to Japan, and throughout the Indo-Malayan region.

This species is a demersal animal, and has been found living in tropical and subtropical waters at a depth of up to 60 m. They are typically found in creviced areas such as reefs and other rocky substrates.

== Behavior and ecology ==
This species, like other cuttlefish, use their extendable arms to capture prey which includes shrimp, crabs, and other small crustaceans. They have also been shown to eat smaller fish and various other invertebrates as well. Sepiadarium kochi are primarily nocturnal and prefer hiding in and under ledges during the day in which they engage in complex burrowing behaviors. This is achieved by jettisoning water through a directed funnel into the sand which covers much of the body. The remaining parts are then covered in sediment using the dorsolateral arm pair. This behavior is believed to have evolved from a common ancestor as the similar clade, Sepiolidae, share a similar burying strategy. Males of the species often do mating displays using their chromatophores typical of other cuttlefish species.
