= Mangrove oyster =

Mangrove oyster is a common name for several oysters that live on mangrove roots and may refer to:

- Crassostrea rhizophorae
- Crassostrea tulipa
- Saccostrea palmula
