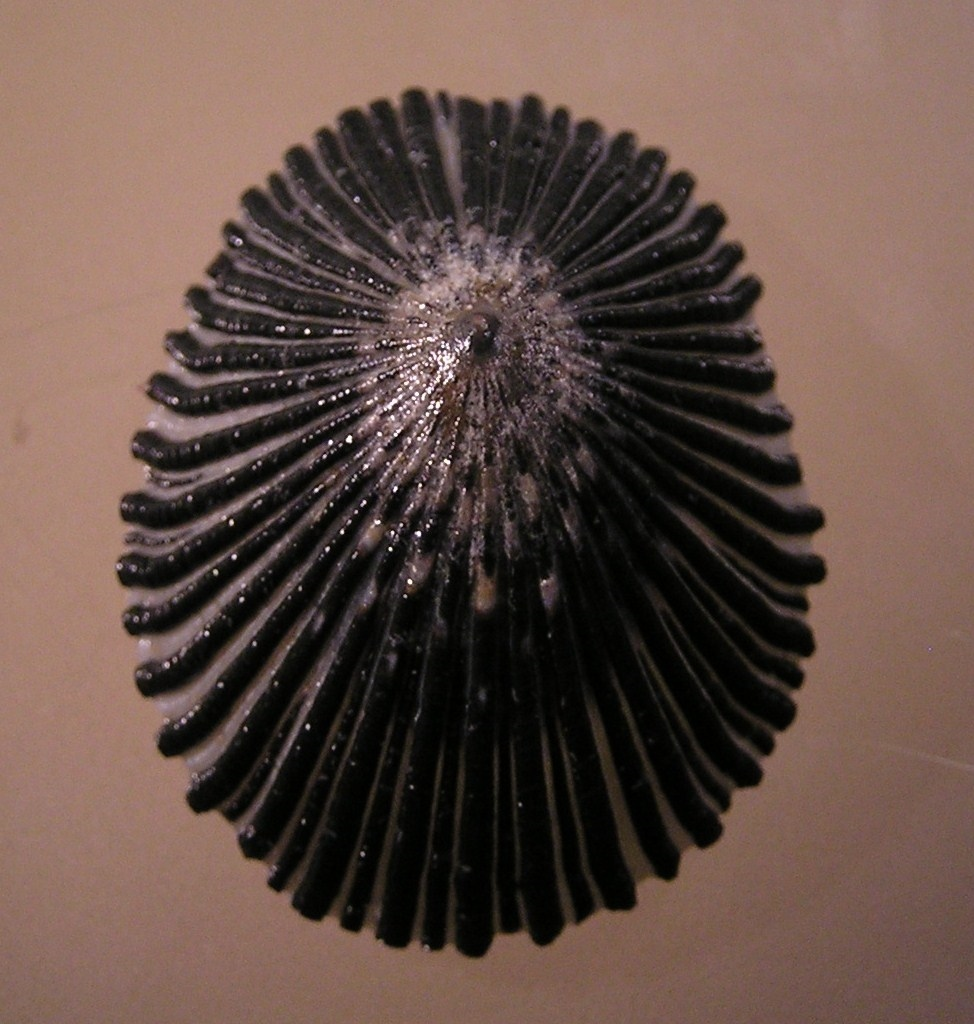

Scientific classification
- Kingdom: Animalia
- Phylum: Mollusca
- Class: Gastropoda
- Subclass: Patellogastropoda
- Family: Nacellidae
- Genus: Cellana
- Species: C. exarata

Binomial name
- Cellana exarata (Reeve, 1854)

= Cellana exarata =

Species of gastropod

Cellana exarata, common name the black-foot ʻopihi and Hawaiian blackfoot is a species of edible true limpet, a marine gastropod mollusc in the family Nacellidae, one of the families of true limpets. 'Opihi are significant in Hawaiian history where they have had many uses such as food, tools, and jewelry. They are known as a "fish of death".

== Classification ==
Hawaiian Blackfoot limpets are gastropods belonging to the subclass Patellogastropoda and the family Nacellidae. They share many characteristics with many types of primitive mollusc other than gastropods, including a structure called the radula and shell micro-structure.

== Distribution ==
This species is endemic to the islands of Hawaii. They are abundant on the basalt or aeolianite wave-exposed, rocky windward shorelines.

== Habitat ==
The limpet, C.exarata, resides in the high intertidal zone on the shores of the Hawaiian islands. The coastline on each island differs such that the different substrates, basalt and aeolianite, affect the shape of the limpets in each location. Additionally, the issues of the intertidal zone, such as wave stress and exposure to heat, have further impacted the shape of the limpet species. The basalt substrate increased the risk of desiccation while the aeolianite substrate had increased exposure to waves, so each required different adaptations.

== Description ==
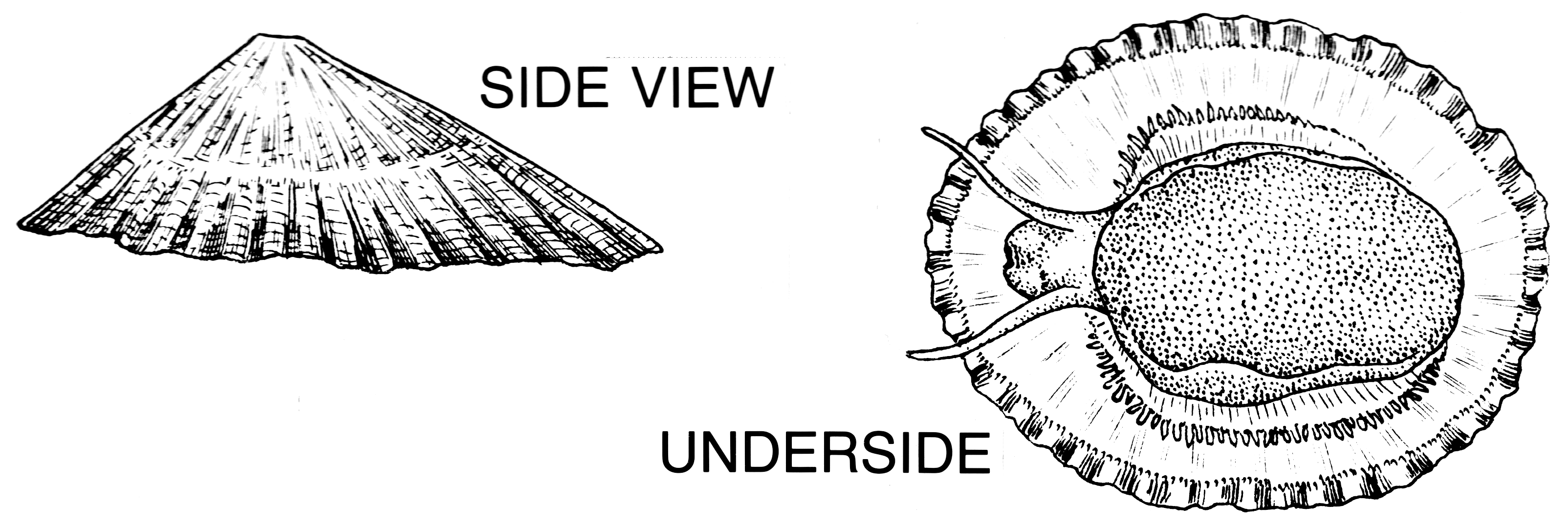
Diagram of a Limpet.

The unique species of limpet, C. exarata, has adapted to develop a shell with increased height compared to its relatives in the lower tidal zones. This gives the limpet an oblong shape as to increase the ratio of volume to evaporative surface area to endure the thermal stress. With their typical habitat being above their common predators, their increased shell height does not have any negative effects for the limpet. Both the shell and the foot of the animal are black in color.

== Anatomy ==
Anatomy of a Saltwater Limpet.

This species has flattened, conical shells with a large, muscular foot. Their shells are cone shaped to protect them from waves, while the foot clings to rocks. Hawaiian Blackfoots, like other limpet species, lack an operculum, unlike other snails. Covered by the shell, is their head, mantle, and foot. Their vision is poor but their head and mantle contain small tentacles that protrude just beyond the edge of their shell. These are sensory organs used to help limpets perceive their surroundings. They feed on algae using a radula, an organ made of chitin that is covered in small teeth. They breathe using gills. Their anatomy suggests that limpets may be the most primitive of the living sea snails. Hawaiian Blackfoots can be distinguished from other Hawaiian limpet species by comparing the ridges on their shells, Blackfoot Limpets are somewhat smooth with ridges that do not extend to the edges of the shell. They can reach up to 60mm in length but average between 33 and 37mm.

== Differing phylogeography ==
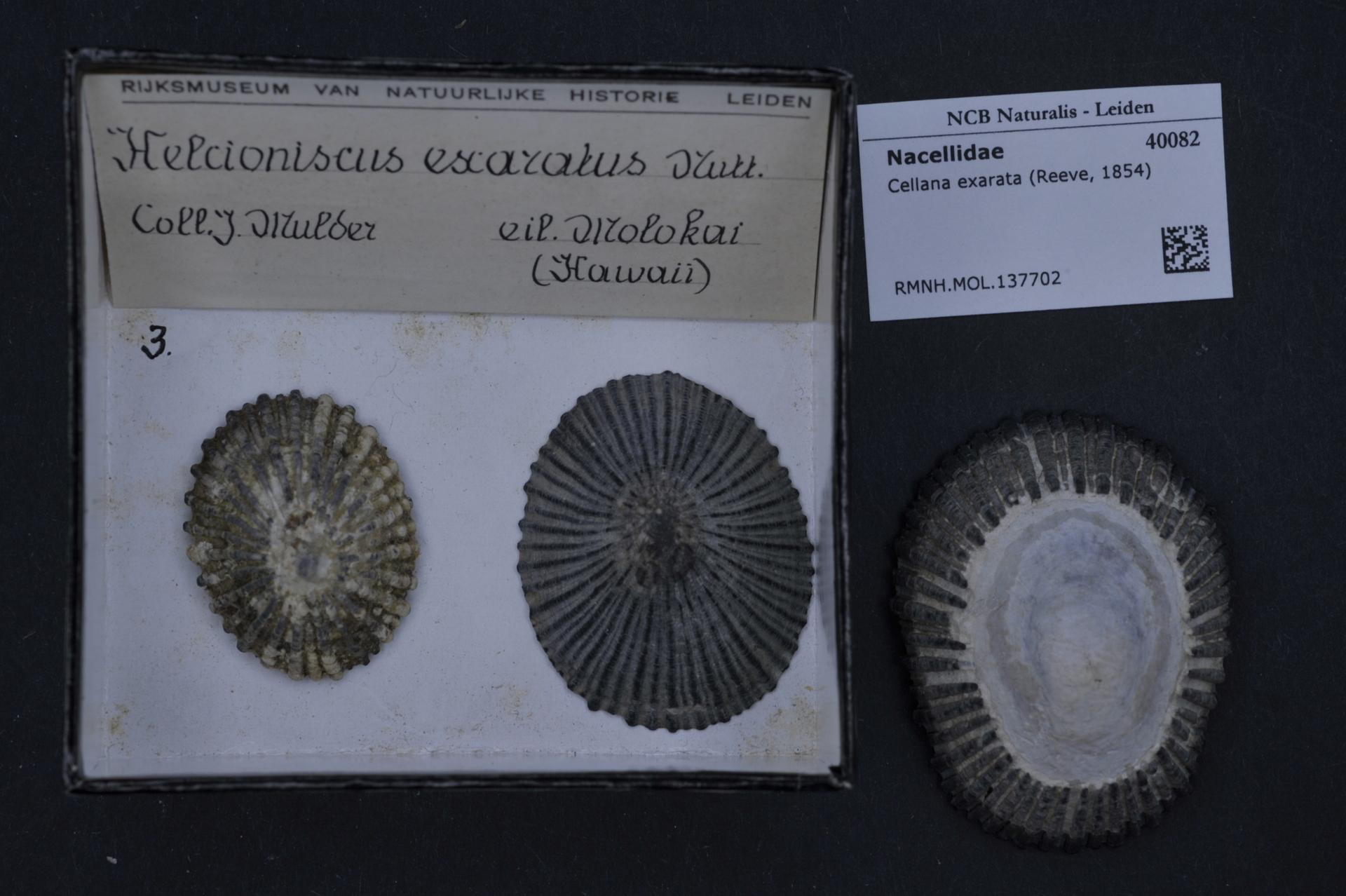

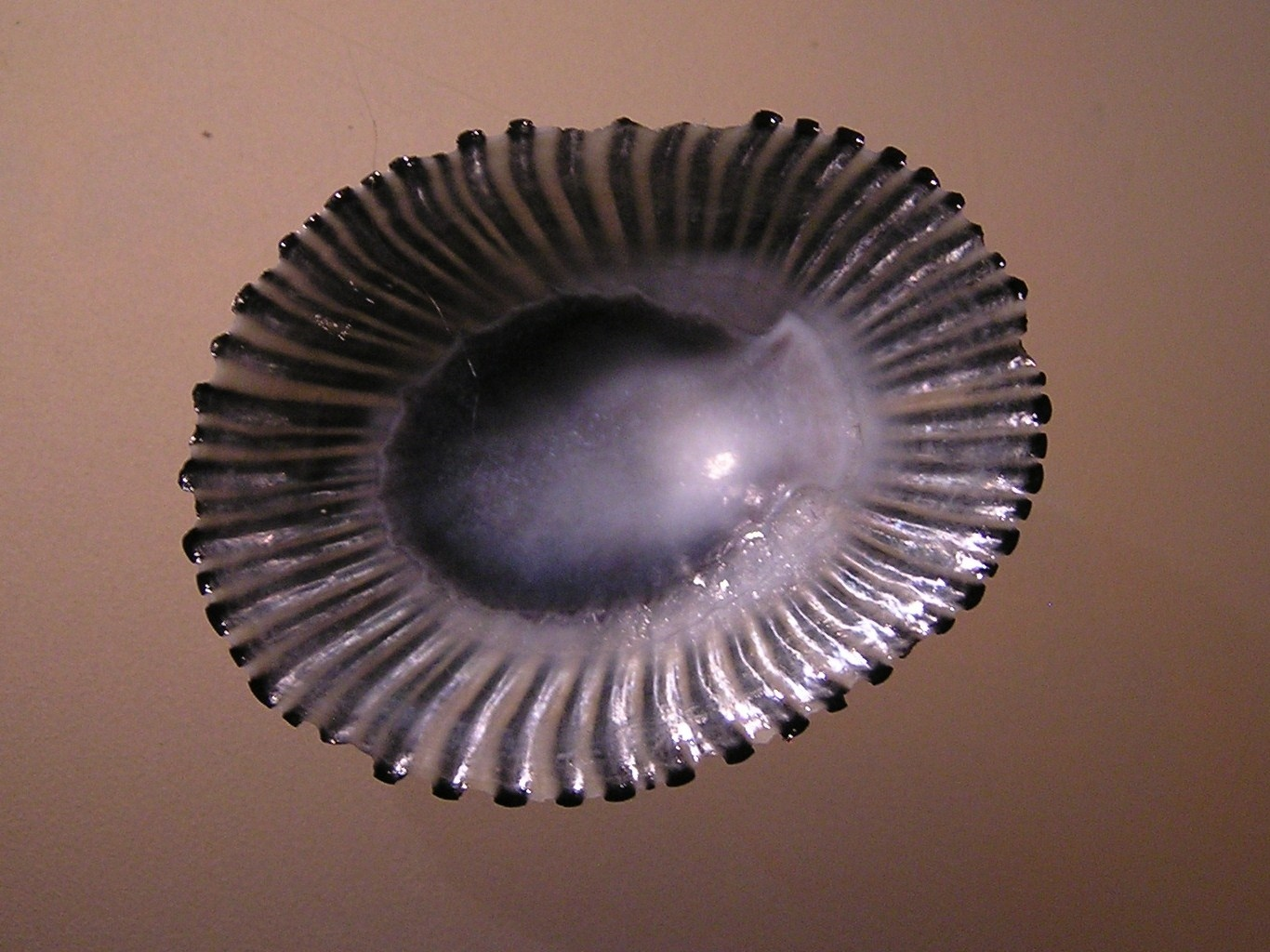
Ventral view

While Limpets have similar life histories, behavior and habitat affinity also plays a major role in the way that three different species of the endemic Hawaiian Cellana spp. which are sympatric species in a monophyletic group. The three species are Cellana exarata, C. sandwincensis, and C. talcosa. The main reasons for these differences are habitat specificity and biogeography. In terms of habitat, C. exarata and C. sandwincensis both live above the waterline, however, the third species, C. talcosa remains in a subtidal habitat. Additionally, these stark differences between species also relate to the restricted gene flow that comes from geographical partitioning and, somewhat, the restriction of channels that separate the species from each other. All in all, this revelation that species so similar to one another, especially ones that have such similar life histories is detrimental to the understanding of these species and especially for Hawaiian Limpets that are so important to the ecosystem of Hawaii, it is important to recognize the differing phylogeography between these three species.

== Reproduction ==
Fertilization occurs externally and sexes are separate within this species of limpets. Without any parental care, the embryos drift in the ocean currents until they settle onto shoreline rocks. C.exarata has a continuous monthly shell growth of 4–5 mm until it reaches sexual maturity. Following that event, its growth decreases to 2–3 mm monthly. Similarly, its weight increases monthly until sexual maturity, then decreases following that. Lastly, Its lifespan is less than one and half years.

== Growth ==
It takes just one year for the shell lengths of Cellana exarata and Cellana sandwincensis to grow over 40 mm. Before sexual maturity, shell length continues to increase at a rate of 4 to 5 mm every month. After sexual maturity, this slows down to 2–3 mm every month. The absolute body weight of both species increases every month as well, until they reach sexual maturity, when that absolute body weight still increases but at a slower rate. However, C. sandwincesis have a lower height and heavier shell than the shells of the species C. exarata, and it has been hypothesized that this may be due to the fact that they live in a more wave-exposed habitat. Lastly, neither species grows very large due to their lifespan being less than 1.5 years long.

== Ecological and evolutionary factors influencing growth ==
Since the Proto-Historic Period, the average limpet size has increased, especially in terms of the mean limpet size in the western shoreline harvests. There are two main reasons why, for one, shelter from trade winds and strong ocean currents in Hawaii have allowed for limpets to grow larger than they were previously able to. Another reason is that there has been less harvesting pressure placed on these limpets allowing them time to grow and evolve.

== Human Utilization ==
This species is used as a food item; it is considered not as high in quality as the yellow-foot ʻopihi, Cellana sandwicensis. A Hawaiian delicacy and 'Opihi can be served either raw or cooked. Very important to Hawaiian culture, it is used for celebrations and those special events. Due to over-picking, legislation was passed in 2006 to limit the sale of 'Opihi and collection is reserved solely for personal use.

== Conservation ==
=== Over-harvesting ===
This species has become scarce due to over-harvesting caused by a lack of rules and regulations. There are now strict rules in place to limit the harvesting of these limpets and sustain healthy population sizes. These regulations limit the size, amount, and species that can be harvested. They can be collected year round but must be at least one and one-fourth inches in the longest dimension to be legally harvested. Due to their habitat, many people have died attempting to collect Hawaiian Blackfoots and this is one reason that commercial fish hatcheries have been working to successfully breed and raise this species in captivity. Some fishermen practice traditional methods that are supposed to protect Blackfoots, these include avoiding limpets that are below the waterline and harvesting predators of the limpets.

=== Climate change ===
Not much research has been performed on the effects of climate change on 'Opihi but a study done in 2019 suggests that this species has a narrow thermal niche that will continue to get narrower as the Earth warms.

== Cultural significance ==
'Opihi were consumed by early Hawaiians and are still a common source of food in the Hawaiian Islands, often eaten raw or boiled. Their shells were often traditionally used for jewelry or tools. There is also evidence that Hawaiian limpet species were used for various religious rituals in Hawaiian history. They are known as the "fish of death" because they can be incredibly dangerous to harvest due to their habitat.
