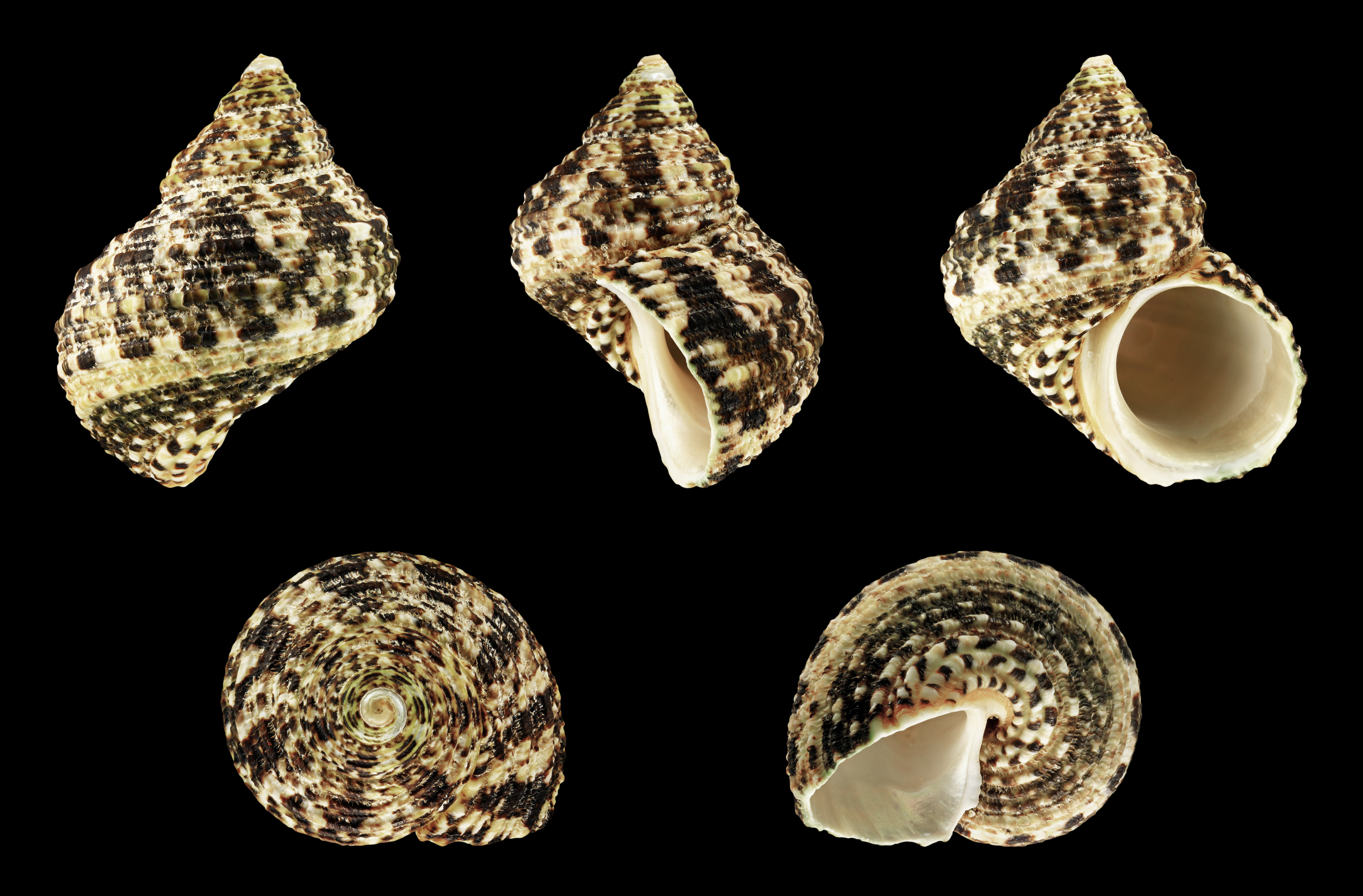

Scientific classification
- Kingdom: Animalia
- Phylum: Mollusca
- Class: Gastropoda
- Subclass: Vetigastropoda
- Order: Trochida
- Family: Turbinidae
- Genus: Turbo
- Species: T. bruneus

Binomial name
- Turbo bruneus (Röding, 1791)

Synonyms
- Lunatica brunneus Röding, 1791 (original description); Turbo brunneus Röding, 1798; Turbo squamosa Röding, 1798; Turbo (Marmarostoma) brunneus (Röding, 1791)

= Turbo bruneus =

Species of gastropod

Turbo bruneus, commonly named the brown (Pacific) dwarf turban or the little burnt turbo, is a species of sea snail, marine gastropod mollusk in the family Turbinidae. These snails are called "turbo" because they can move quite quickly for a snail, using a muscular foot to glide along the ocean floor. They feed on algae and other small organisms that they scrape off rocks and other surfaces.

Turbo bruneus snails are important members of their ecosystem because they help to control the population of algae and other small organisms, which can become overgrown and harm other marine life if left unchecked.

== Description ==
The length of the shell varies between 20 mm and 50 mm. The size of the Turbo bruneus shells are basically about 5-6 centimeters in diameter and have a rounded, conical shape with a pointed vertex. The color of the shell is brown, with a glossy, polished appearance.

These snails are found in a wide range of habitats, including coral reefs, rocky shorelines and seagrass beds. They can be found at depths of up to 30 meters but are more commonly found in shallow waters around 5–10 meters deep.

Turbo bruneus snails are firstly herbivores, feeding on a variety of seaweed and other small organisms that they scrape off surfaces using a specialized feeding structure called a radula. They are also known to consume small crustaceans and other invertebrates when food is in short supply.

Turbo bruneus snails have an interesting reproduction process. They are dioecious, meaning that each individual snail is either male or female. During mating season, male snails release their sperm into the water, which is then carried by currents to nearby females. After fertilization, the female snail lays hundreds of small eggs, which are enclosed in a jelly-like substance and attached to rocks or other hard surfaces. The eggs hatch into free-swimming larvae, which eventually settle on the ocean floor and grow into adult snails.

One of the interesting feature of Turbo bruneus snails is their operculum. This is a small, round, calcareous plate that covers the opening of their shell when they retract their body inside. The operculum is important for protecting the snail from predators and maintaining moisture inside the shell.

Another unique feature of these snails is their ability to survive out of water for short periods of time. When the tide goes out, Turbo bruneus snails can close their operculum and seal themselves inside their shell to prevent drying out. This adaptation allows them to survive in intertidal zones where they may be exposed to air for extended periods.

In addition to their ecological importance, Turbo bruneus snails are also of economic importance to some coastal communities, as their shells are often used in traditional crafts and jewelry making.

== Distribution ==
This marine species occurs in the Red Sea, in the Central Indo-Pacific, in the Western Pacific Ocean, off East India, the Philippines and off Western Australia.
