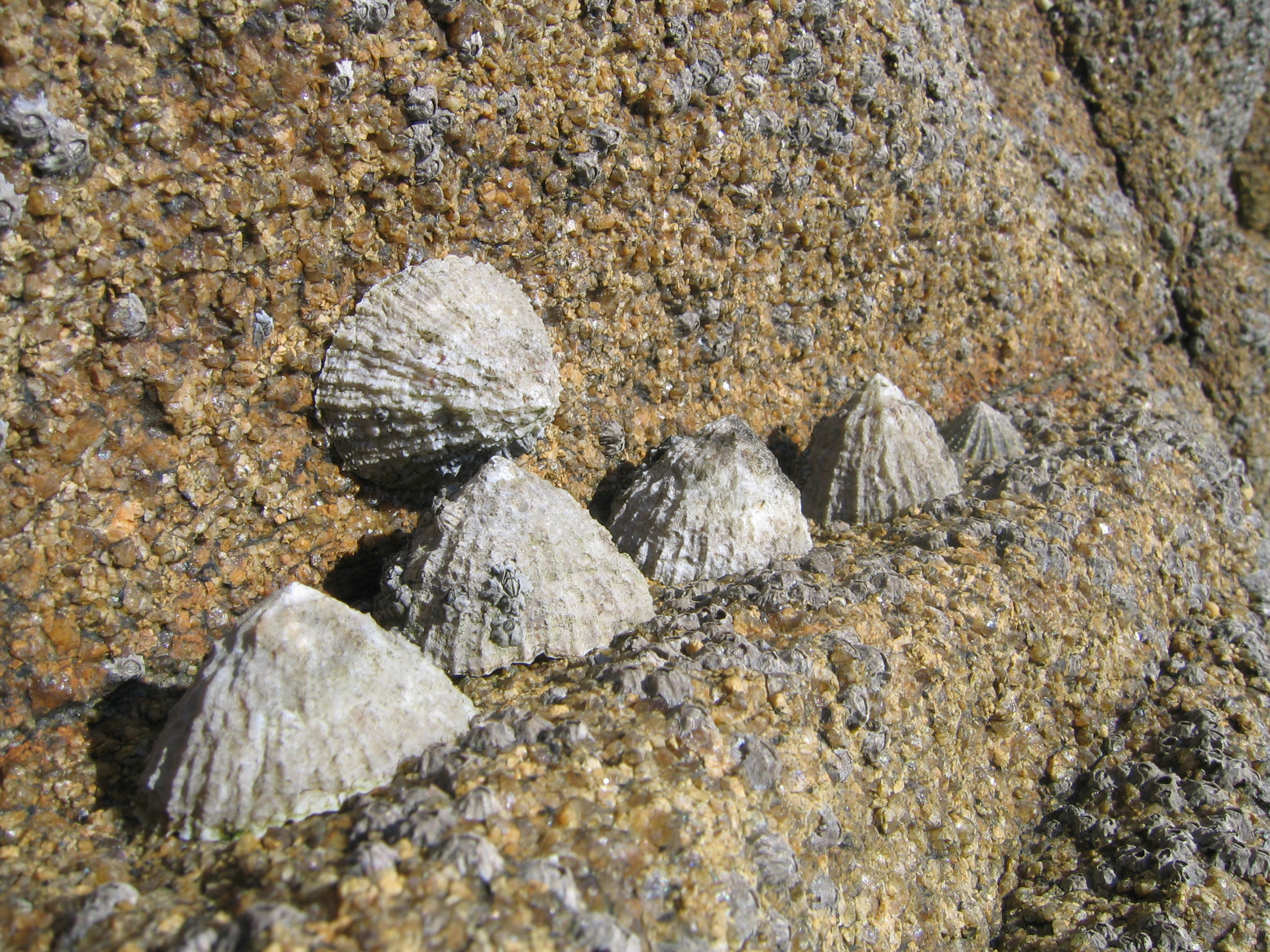
- Patella rustica on rocks
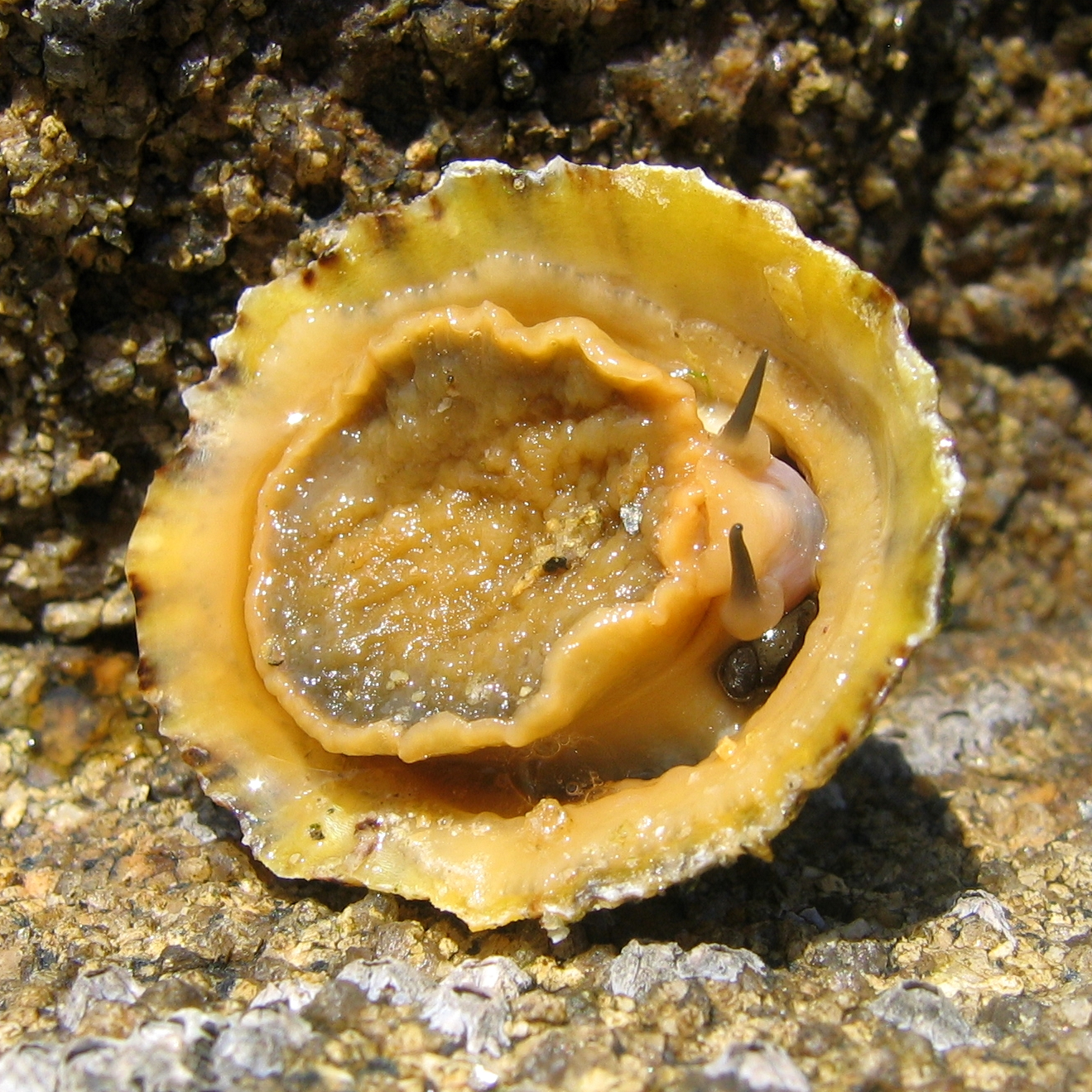
- ventral view of Patella rustica

Scientific classification
- Kingdom: Animalia
- Phylum: Mollusca
- Class: Gastropoda
- Subclass: Patellogastropoda
- Family: Patellidae
- Genus: Patella
- Species: P. rustica

Binomial name
- Patella rustica Linnaeus, 1758

Synonyms
- Patella gorgonica da Costa, 1771; Patella lusitanica Gmelin 1791; Patella lusitanica var. minor Marion, 1883; Patella nigropunctata Reeve, 1854; Patella polita Risso, 1826; Patella punctata Lamarck, 1819; Patella punctulata Gmelin, 1791 (dubious synonym); Patella rustica var. maroccana Pallary, 1920; Patella rustica var. orientalis Pallary, 1938; Patella squamata Röding, 1798; Patella subgranularis de Blainville, 1825; Patella variabilis Risso, 1826

= Patella rustica =

Rustic limpet

Species of gastropod

Patella rustica, the Lusitanian limpet or rustic limpet is a species of sea snail, a true limpet, a marine gastropod mollusk in the family Patellidae, one of the families of true limpets. It is a rocky shore intertidal mollusc found throughout the Mediterranean and the north-east Atlantic from Mauritania to southern France.
