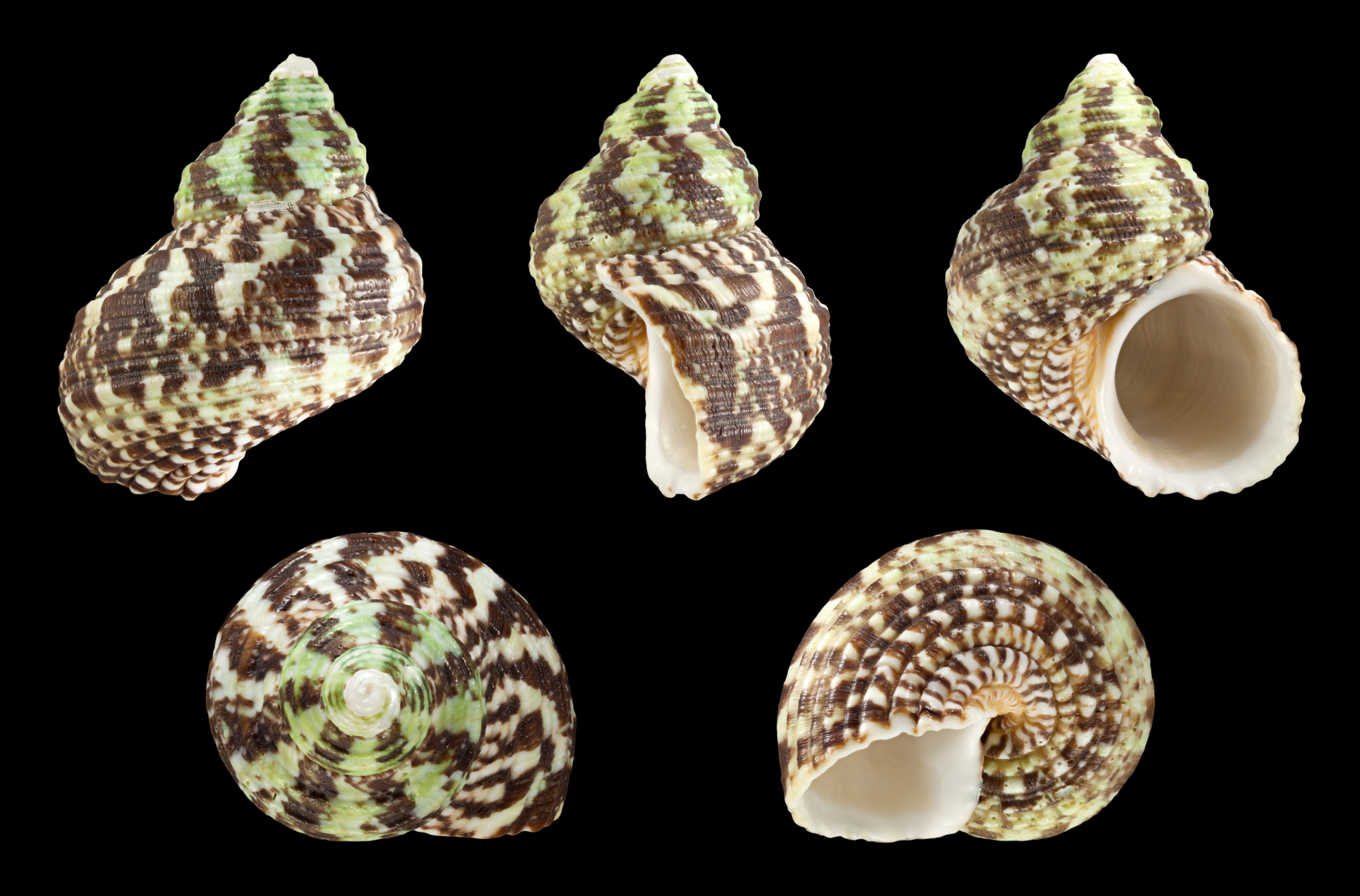
- A shell of Turbo intercostalis

Scientific classification
- Kingdom: Animalia
- Phylum: Mollusca
- Class: Gastropoda
- Subclass: Vetigastropoda
- Order: Trochida
- Family: Turbinidae
- Genus: Turbo
- Species: T. intercostalis

Binomial name
- Turbo intercostalis Menke in Philippi, 1846

Synonyms
- Turbo concinnus Philippi; Turbo disjunctus Anton; Turbo intercostalis Menke, 1843; Turbo (Marmarostoma) intercostalis Menke in Philippi, 1846; Turbo pulcher Reeve, 1842; Turbo radiatus Reeve, 1848; Turbo sandwicensis Pease, 1861; Turbo semicostatus Pease, 1861

= Turbo intercostalis =

Species of gastropod

Turbo intercostalis, common name the ribbed turban, is a species of sea snail, marine gastropod mollusk in the family Turbinidae.

== Description ==
The length of the shell varies between 25 mm and 80 mm. The solid, perforate shell has an ovate-conic shape. Its color pattern is green or gray, radiately flammulated with black, green or brown, sometimes unicolored. The six whorls are convex and sometimes subangulate above. They contain numerous unequal revolving lirae and obsolescent incremental striae. The aperture is round, the upper angle sometimes separated from the body whorl, and projecting. The base of the shell is rounded. The columella is excavated at the umbilicus.

The circular operculum contains five whorls. Its outer surface is granulose, green or olivaceous at its center, yellowish at the margins.

== Distribution ==
This marine species occurs of Western and Southwestern Australia; in the Indian Ocean off Chagos, the Mascarene Basin and the Hawaiian Islands.
