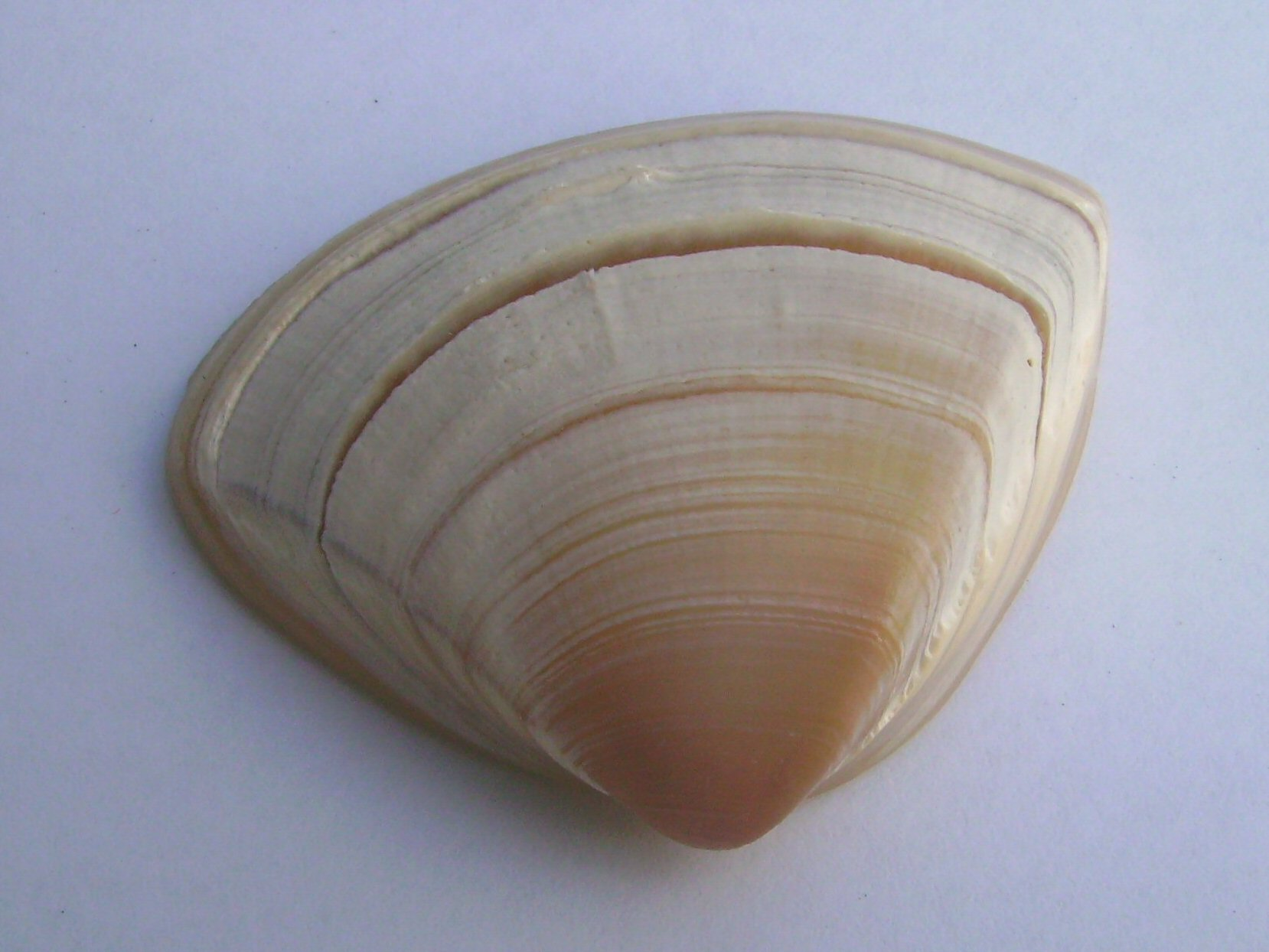

Scientific classification
- Kingdom: Animalia
- Phylum: Mollusca
- Class: Bivalvia
- Order: Venerida
- Superfamily: Mactroidea
- Family: Mactridae
- Genus: Crassula
- Species: C. aequilatera

Binomial name
- Crassula aequilatera (Reeve, 1854)

Synonyms
- Mactra aequilatera Reeve, 1854; Mactra aequilateralis Deshayes, 1854; Spisula aequilateralis (Deshayes, 1854)

= Crassula aequilatera =

Species of bivalve

Crassula aequilatera, known as the triangle shell, is a surf clam, a moderately large marine bivalve mollusc in the family Mactridae.

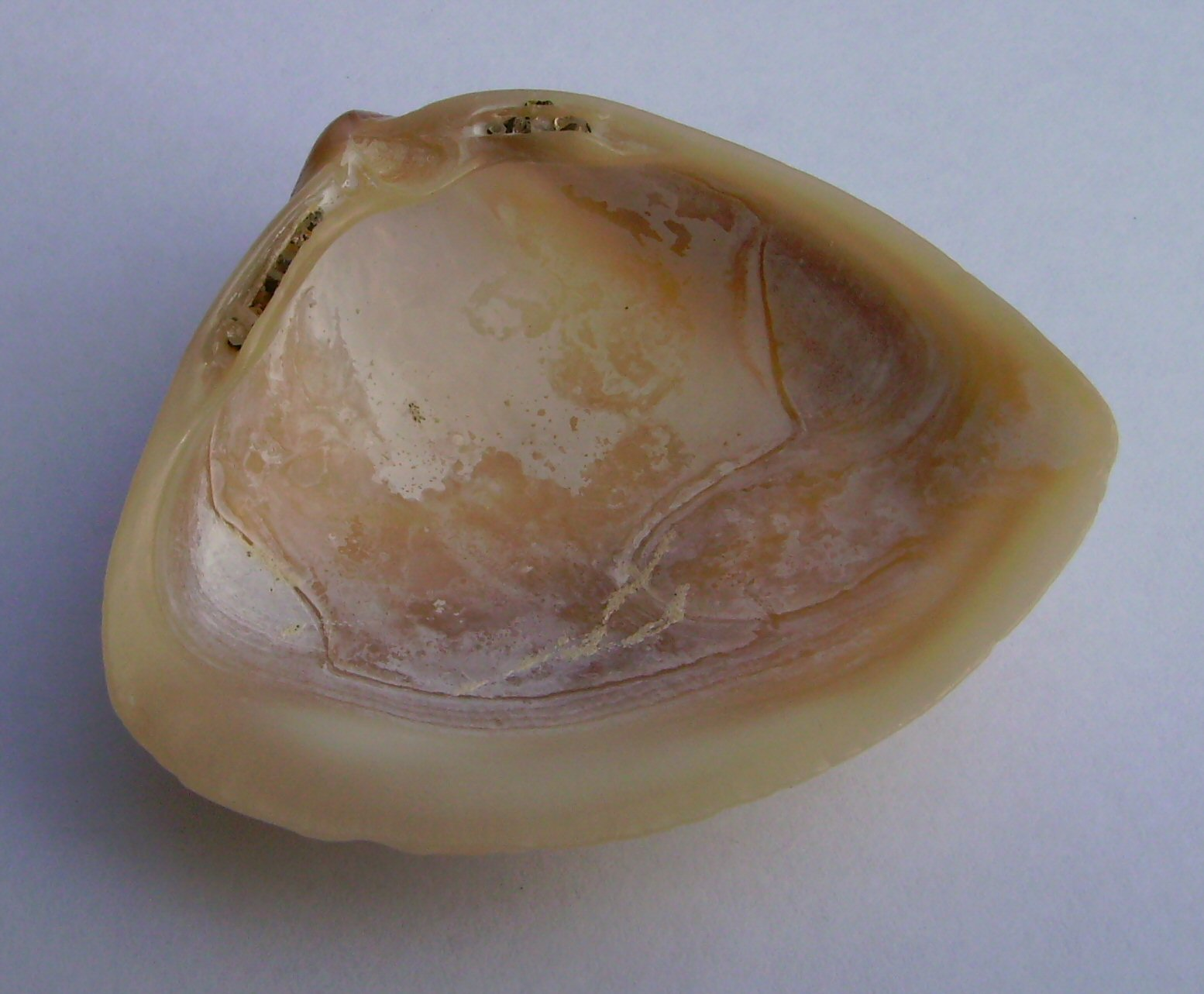
Inside view of Crassula aequilatera

== Distribution ==
This marine species is endemic to New Zealand.
