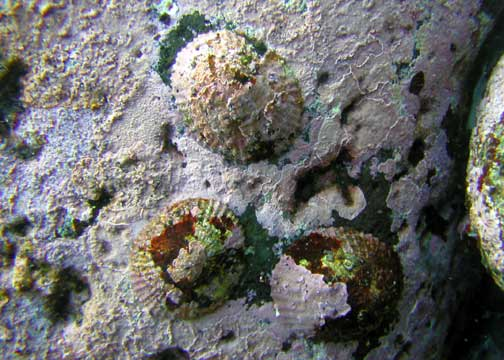

Scientific classification
- Kingdom: Animalia
- Phylum: Mollusca
- Class: Gastropoda
- Subclass: Patellogastropoda
- Family: Nacellidae
- Genus: Cellana
- Species: C. sandwicensis

Binomial name
- Cellana sandwicensis (Pease, 1861)

= Cellana sandwicensis =

Species of gastropod

Cellana sandwicensis, common name the yellow-foot ʻopihi, is a species of edible true limpet, a marine gastropod mollusc in the family Nacellidae, one of the families of true limpets.

== Distribution ==
This species is endemic to the islands of Hawaii.

Cellana sandwicensis has been found in Taiwanese coastal waters, possibly spread by larvae transported in ship ballast water.

== Habitat ==
This limpet lives lower in the intertidal zone than Cellana exarata, the black-foot ʻopihi. They are found, strongly attached, sometimes with considerable force, with their foot to rocks or other hard substrates. They feed by grazing on algae.

== Description ==
The large, muscular foot of the animal is yellow in the center but gray on its margin. The white head is short with one pair of tentacles with dark pigments on the backside. The flattened shell is dark green on the outside and silvery white on the inside. Its shape is almost oval and its apex is situated somewhat lower than the central. The ribs radiate from the central and extend beyond the margin.

== Human use ==
This species is used as a food item. It is considered a higher quality food than the black-foot ʻopihi.

== Legislation ==
In 2009, the Hawaii Legislature approved a bill that would have banned the harvest of ʻopihi (limpets) on the island of Oahu for five years. The bill was successfully vetoed by governor Linda Lingle.

Gallery

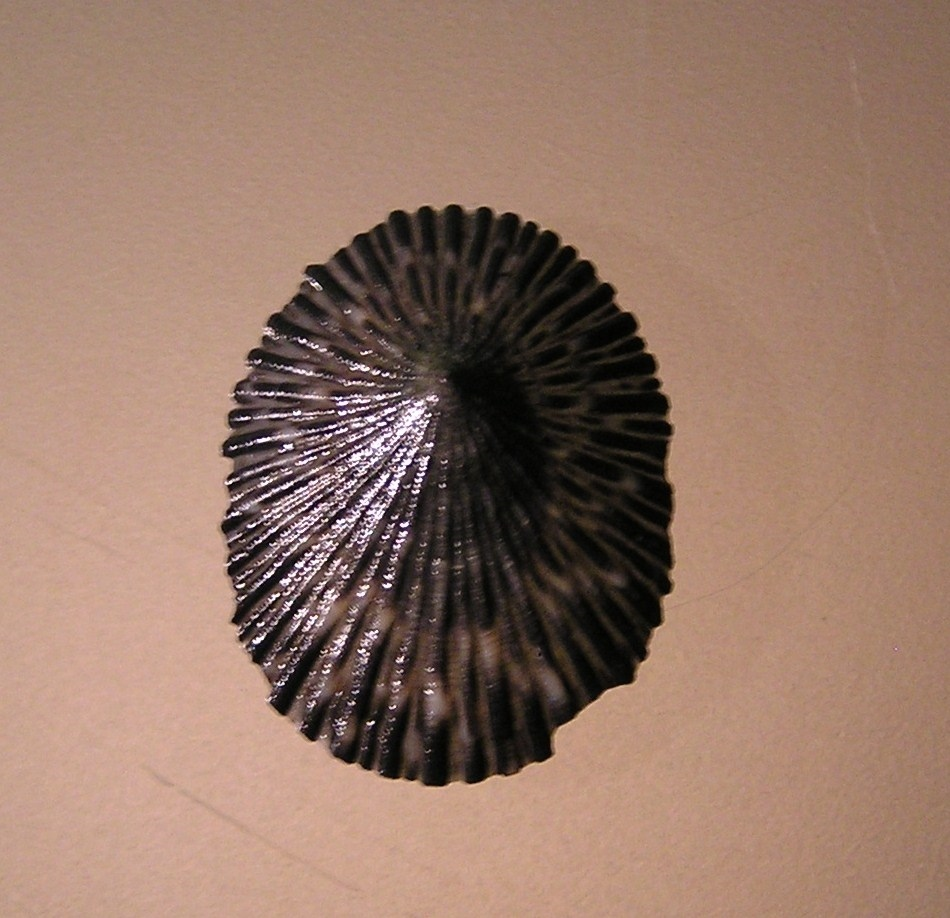
apical view

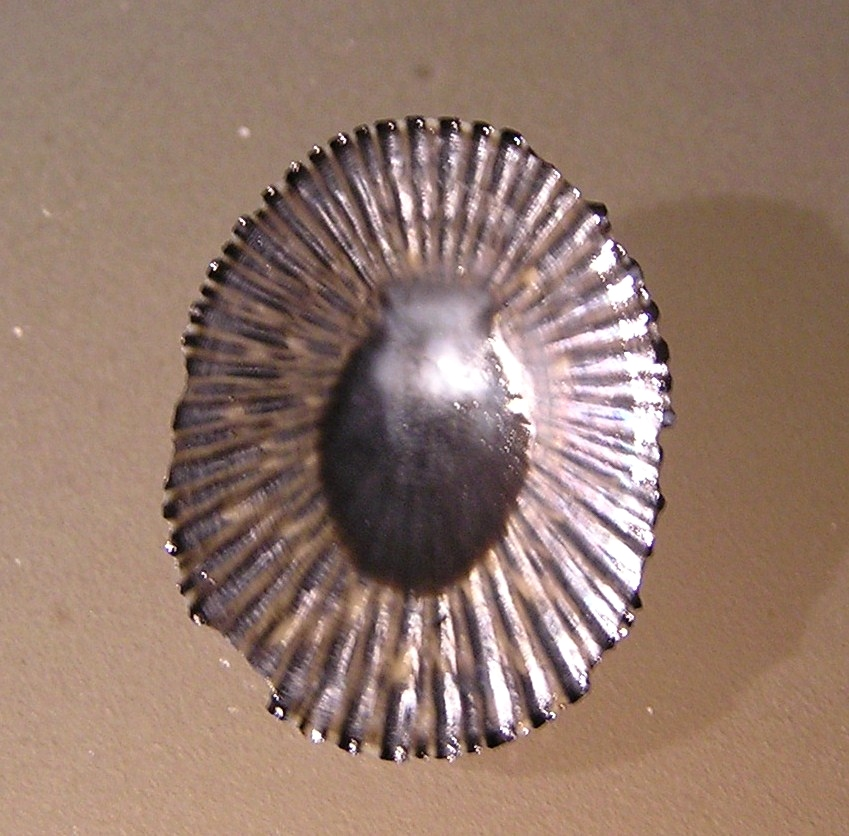
basal view
