= Department of Fisheries (Brunei) =

Government agency of Brunei

Coordinates: 5.0041559°N 115.0646054°E

- Jabatan Perikanan جابتن ڤرايکنن
- National emblem of Brunei

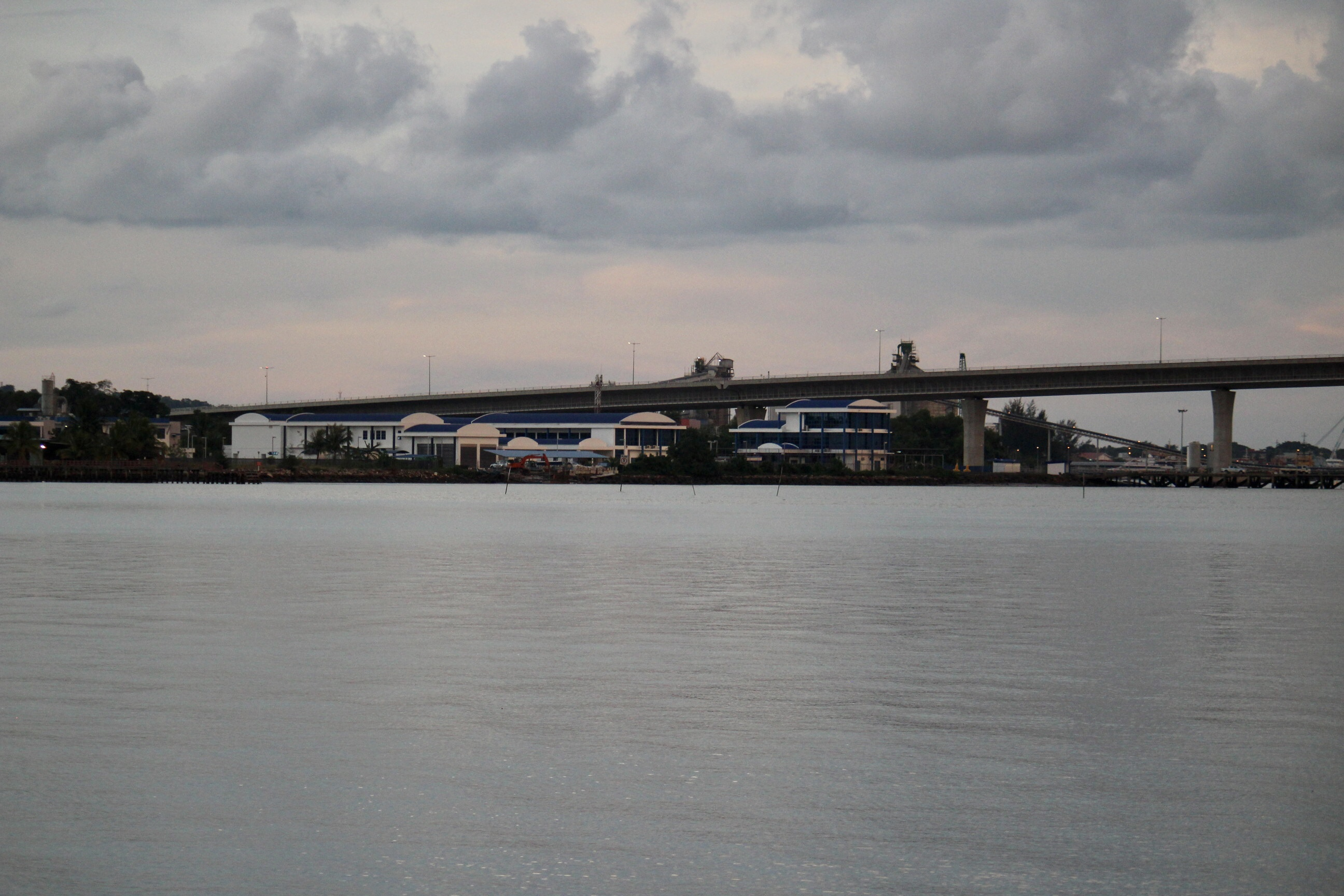
- Headquarters in Muara, Brunei

Agency overview
- Formed: 1966; 60 years ago
- Jurisdiction: Government of Brunei
- Headquarters: Simpang 27, Serasa, Brunei–Muara, Brunei BT1728
- Minister responsible: Abdul Manaf Metussin, Minister of Primary Resources and Tourism
- Agency executives: Wanidawati Tamat, Director; Matzaini Juna, Deputy Director
- Parent agency: Ministry of Primary Resources and Tourism
- Website: www.fisheries.gov.bn

The Department of Fisheries (DoF; Malay: Jabatan Perikanan; Jawi: جابتن ڤرايکنن), also referred to as the Fisheries Department, is a department overseen by the Ministry of Primary Resources and Tourism (MPRT). The country's fisheries authority is the Department of Fisheries under the MPRT.

== Background ==
The department strives for sustainable growth of the fishing industry's production through increased productivity and an export-focused strategy. Additionally, to boost productivity and the production of the fishing sector while also focusing on the export market by boosting both domestic and foreign direct investment (FDI). Fisheries stock assessment, planning, and management; conservation of fisheries resources; and management of fisheries resources are all tasks that fall under the purview of the department. creation of a sustainable and logical aquaculture sector; creation of seafood products; providing technical and support services to the fisheries industry; implementing a food safety and quality control program in the seafood processing business.

The nation has a 269 kilometres (167 mi) long coastline facing the South China Sea with a total land area of 5,765 square kilometres (2,226 sq mi). About 8,600 km2 make up the continental shelf, and 5,614 km2 make up the exclusive economic zone (EEZ). Capture fisheries, aquaculture, and seafood processing are some of the subsectors of the fisheries in Brunei. In 2021, there were 4,46 fish farmers and 2,195 fishermen, respectively. Fish available for consumption accounted for 41.20 kg/capita in 2019 and 0.32% of the nation's gross domestic product (GDP) was derived from fishing. Around 94% of the total production comes from marine capture fisheries, and about 6% comes from aquaculture. The productivity of inland catch fisheries is subpar.

== Legislation ==
=== Fisheries Act (1972) ===
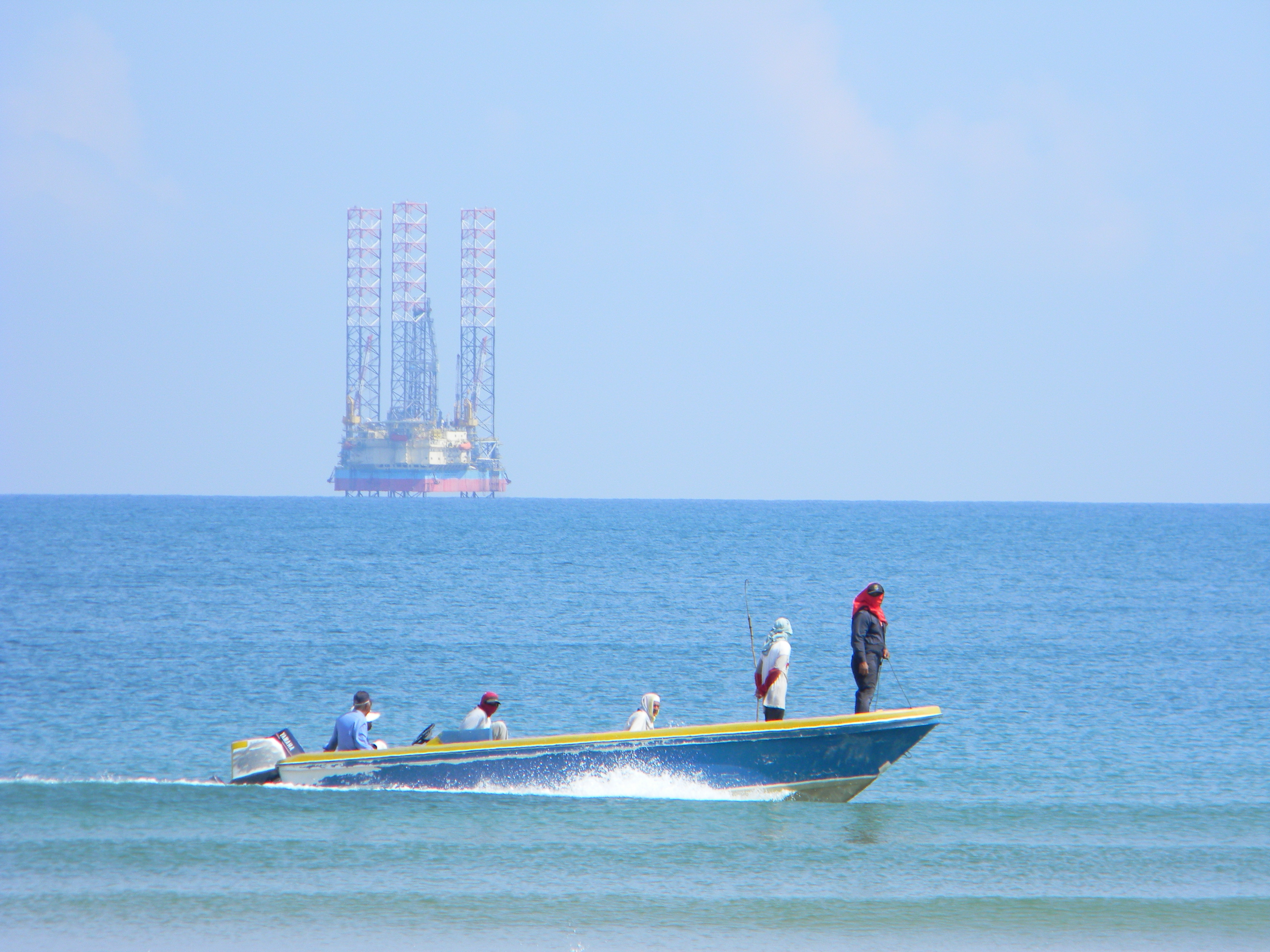
Bruneian fishermen on a boat off Muara Beach.

The Act became commenced on 5 March 1973. The management and preservation of Brunei's fishery resources are outlined in this Act. The Act appoints a Director of Fisheries and a deputy director of Fisheries, both of whom have the authority to delegate the implementation of this Act to any person. Authorized Officers will have the following powers: stop, search, and detain any vessel or vehicle being utilized to catch or transport fish in violation of this Act; search and examine fishing gear; etc. The Act also establishes the following: the Minister's authority to make regulations pertaining to fishing and fisheries; the authority of licensing officers and the issue of licenses; offenses and penalties; etc.

=== Fishery Limits Act (1983) ===
Using the baselines from which the breadth of the territorial sea adjacent to Brunei is defined, this Act increases the fisheries boundaries of Brunei to 200 nautical miles (370 km; 230 mi). Any nation outside of Brunei and regions inside its fishery limits must be designated by the government of Brunei in order for fishing boats registered in that nation to be allowed to fish there. Except in the situations outlined in the Act, no other foreign fishing vessels are permitted to enter the Brunei fishery limits.

=== Fisheries Order (2009) ===
An order to codify the laws governing fisheries, fishing, fish processing, fish marketing, fish distribution, and to provide for matters related to or incidental to those laws. The Brunei Fishery Limits Act's Section 4 as well as the Fisheries Act are repealed. The administration and preservation of Brunei's fishery resources are outlined in this Order. To implement the directives of this Order, a director of fisheries and a deputy director of fisheries shall be appointed. To guarantee the best possible use of fishery resources, the Director must create fisheries plans. The Order specifies the criteria for applying for licenses.

In order to utilize fishing vessels, operate or develop marine cultural systems, operate or own fishing equipment, hold or arrange sporting fishing activities, etc., licenses are necessary. License terms, expiration dates, and cancellation are all covered in the text. The Order also establishes zones for lobster fishery, maritime reserves, and marine parks, along with limits on these regions. The Order also covers inland fisheries development and management, offenses and punishments, the authority of enforcement agents, jurisdiction, and proof, among other things.

== History ==
In 1966, the current Fisheries Department was founded. Early the following year, it began operations with 15 local employees and 2 skilled expatriate officers. The Royal Customs and Excise building in the heart of Bandar Seri Begawan, originally known as Brunei Town, served as the department's first home. When it was finished, the office was relocated to the Churchill Memorial Building. Along with the Fisheries Department, the Churchill Memorial Building also hosted a portion of the Museums Department, which featured the Winston Churchill Museum, and the Hassanal Bolkiah Aquarium with its freshwater and marine aquariums. The Royal Regalia Exhibition replaced the Hassanal Bolkiah Aquarium in 1991, and the Fisheries Department relocated to a rented space at the Athirah Building Complex. In March 1996, the division relocated to the brand-new Ministry of Industry and Primary Resources building.

During the first few years of existence, the Hassanal Bolkiah Aquarium and a freshwater fish farm at Kampong Tungku, in the Brunei–Muara District, received the majority of the department's staff and financial resources (about 60%). The artisanal catch fisheries received the majority of the remaining labor and financial resources. However, the government did acknowledge the value of marine fish resources, and in 1968 a brief survey was carried out in Brunei Waters. Despite the survey's rather constrained scope, it did reveal the existence of a moderate fish resource that can be developed, and more research was required to ascertain the resource's magnitude.

== Organisational structure ==
The structure of the department is as follows:

- Director of Fisheries
  - Aquatic Animal Health & Laboratory Services Centre
  - Deputy Director of Fisheries
    - Industry
    - Research
  - Senior Special Duties Officer
    - Policy & Planning
  - Deputy Director of Fisheries II
    - Belait, Tutong & Temburong District
    - Regulatory
    - Administration
    - Investment

== Initiatives ==
=== Aquaculture ===
Aquaculture was first introduced to Brunei in the 1970s by the Department of Fisheries. Freshwater fish were raised as part of the first aquaculture operation in Sungai Jambu. On the other hand, the country's marine aquaculture industry began with the trial cultivation of the Bruneian mangrove oyster, Saccostrea cucullata. However, the oyster testing culture displayed disappointing growth results. Green mussels, Perna viridis, were the second species to undergo marine culture, and the experiments were more fruitful with this species. The lack of spit supply remained a barrier to the growth of the mussel industry. Around the same time as the prawn industry's growth in the 1980s, marine fish and prawn culture got its start. Seabass, Lates calcarifer, broodstocks were brought into the country from Thailand in 1984, and local producers were then given access to seabass cage culture for commercial production in 1990. After a successful endeavor with seabass, the Fisheries Department decided to cultivate groupers, another marine fish species that is equally popular and pricey with customers and restaurateurs.

=== SEAFDEC ===
On 10 April 2017, the Government of Brunei's hosted the 49th Meeting of the Southeast Asian Fisheries Development Center (SEAFDEC) Council in Bandar Seri Begawan from 3 to 7 April 2017. The proposals for "Establishment of Regional Repository Center for Marine Fisheries" and "Monitoring Methodologies for the Resources of Inland Fisheries and Freshwater Aquaculture" from the Japan-ASEAN Integration Fund (JAIF) were approved. The "Southeast Asian State of Fisheries and Aquaculture" or SEASOFIA was approved for printing and subsequent distribution. The Council acknowledged the tight collaboration between SEAFDEC and regional/international partner agencies/organizations in carrying out initiatives that address countries' priorities for the sustainable development of fisheries in Southeast Asia.

== See also ==
- Fishing Industry in Brunei
- Economy of Brunei
- Fishing industry in Brunei
