= Transmembrane protein 145 =

Gene on human chromosome 19

TMEM145

Identifiers
- Aliases: TMEM145, transmembrane protein 145
- External IDs: MGI: 3607779; GeneCards: TMEM145

Gene location (Human)
Chr.	Chromosome 19 (human)
Band	19q13.2	Start	42,313,309 bp
Band	19q13.2	End	42,325,064 bp

Gene location (Mouse)
Chr.	Chromosome 7 (mouse)
Band	7|7 A3	Start	25,005,531 bp
Band	7|7 A3	End	25,015,620 bp
RNA expression pattern
Bgee	Human / Mouse (ortholog); Top expressed in: right hemisphere of cerebellum; primary visual cortex; right frontal lobe; superior frontal gyrus; dorsolateral prefrontal cortex; Brodmann area 9; hypothalamus; anterior cingulate cortex; prefrontal cortex; putamen / Top expressed in: cerebellar cortex; hypothalamus; neural layer of retina; visual cortex; primary visual cortex; superior frontal gyrus; olfactory bulb; neural tube; mesencephalon; dentate gyrus of hippocampal formation granule cell; More reference expression data
BioGPS	n/a
Orthologs
Databases	NCBI: entry; OMA: entry
Species	Human	Mouse
Entrez	284339	330485
Ensembl	ENSG00000167619	ENSMUSG00000043843
UniProt	Q8NBT3	Q8C4U2
RefSeq (mRNA)	NM_173633; NM_001366910	NM_183311
RefSeq (protein)	NP_775904; NP_001353839	NP_899134; NP_001390131; NP_001390132
Location (UCSC)	Chr 19: 42.31 – 42.33 Mb	Chr 7: 25.01 – 25.02 Mb
PubMed search
- Wikidata
View/Edit Human	View/Edit Mouse

Transmembrane protein 145 is a protein, which in humans, is encoded by the TMEM145 gene. TMEM145 has been associated with tumor suppression in breast cancer and prostate cancer.

== Gene ==
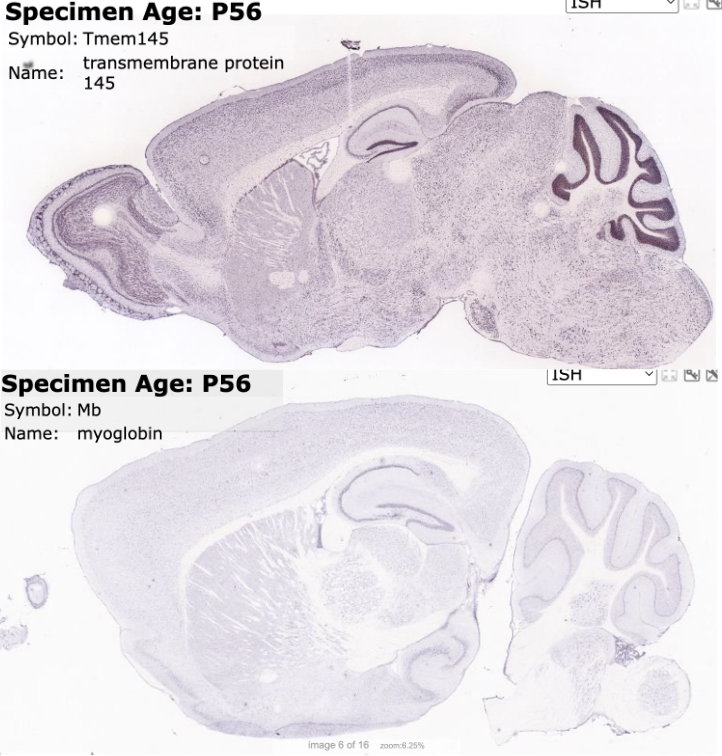
TMEM145 (top) vs. Myoglobin (bottom) in situ hybridization using Mus musculus. The mouse was 8 weeks old. Myoglobin does not localize to the brain, so this shows the significance of TMEM145 localization to the brain.

The TMEM145 Gene is located on the plus strand of Chromosome 19 at 19q13.2. This gene spans 11,756 nucleotides and contains 15 exons. RNA-sequencing data from NCBI displayed that TMEM145 displays highest expression in the brain with notable expression also in the adrenal glands. Microarray-assessed tissue expression revealed that human TMEM145 is expressed ubiquitously with moderate variation across different tissues. The human TMEM145 protein has a lower than average expression level in comparison to other human proteins. The Human Protein Atlas showed human TMEM145 to have highest expression in the cerebellum with second highest expression in the cerebral cortex. In situ hybridization data from Allen Brain Atlas showed TMEM145 RNA expression in Mus Musculus with highest expression in the cerebellum and dentate gyrus.

TMEM145 gene. The 15 exons are shown in blue and the grey lines are the introns.

== Transcript ==
Based on NCBI Gene, the longest high-quality mRNA sequence is transcript variant 1 (NM_001366910.1) which encodes isoform 1, the longest protein isoform. This mRNA sequence contains 2298 base pairs.

== Protein ==
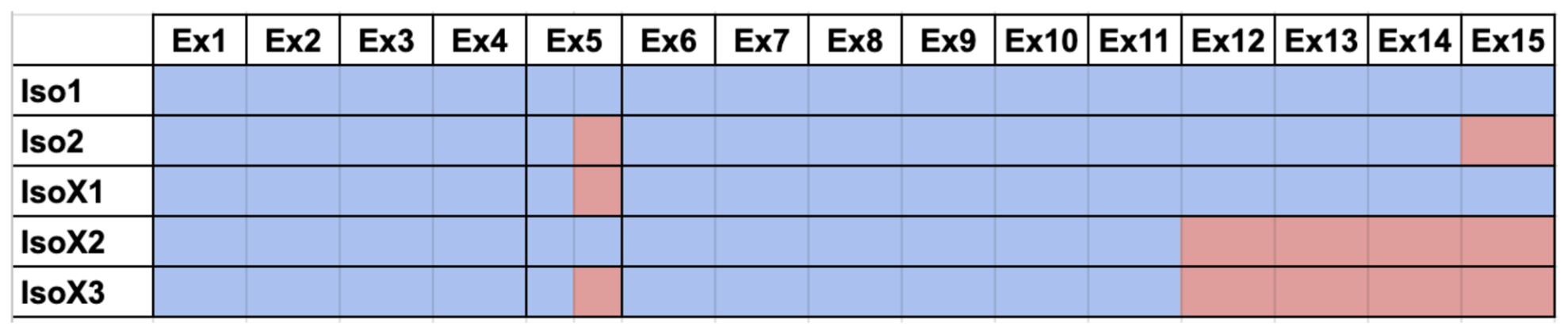
Isoforms of Human TMEM145 protein. "Ex" stands for exon. Red indicates a missing part while blue indicates present exons/parts of exons.

The TMEM145 gene encodes transmembrane protein 145 isoform 1 precursor (NP_001353839.1) with a molecular weight of ~ 60kDa and contains 563 amino acids. The isoelectric point of this protein is 8.8. There are five protein isoforms and all are displayed in the table.

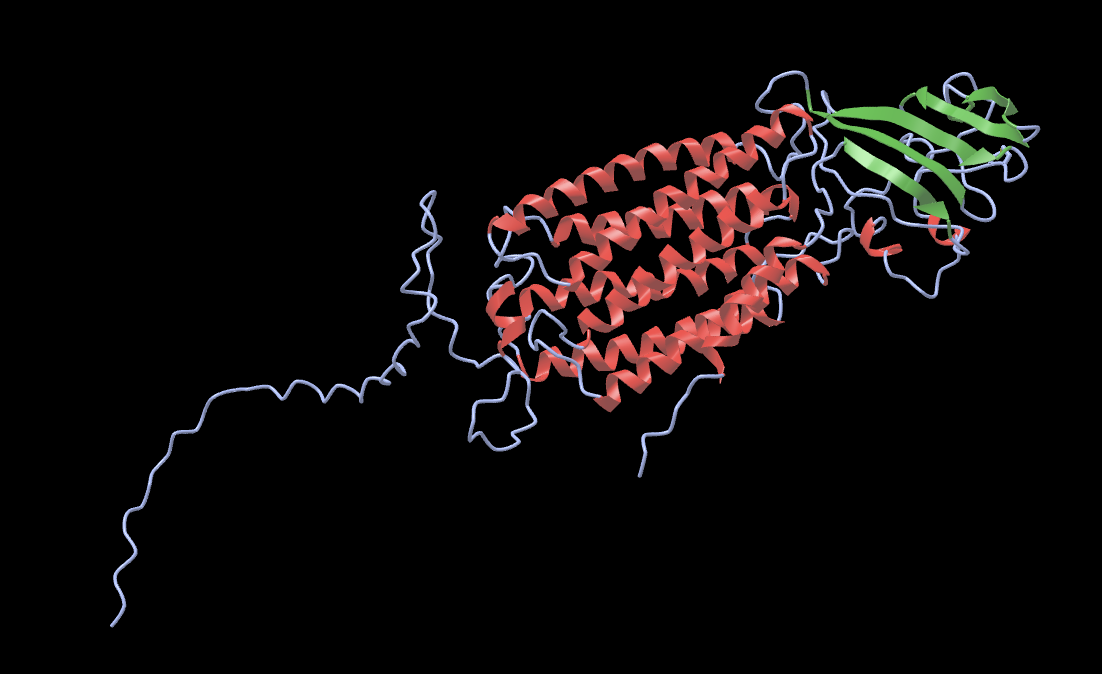
TMEM145 predicted tertiary structure. Alpha-helices are shown in red while beta-sheets are shown in green. This was created with AlphaFold and icn3d.

TMEM145 conceptual translation. This includes the signal peptide, cleavage site, exon boundaries, transmembrane domains, and the start and stop codons.

Isoform	Accession Number	Protein (aa)	Molecular Weight (kDa)
Isoform 1	NP_001353839	563	~60
Isoform 2	NP_775904	493	~52
Isoform X1	XP_054176598	549	~60
Isoform X2	XP_054176599	389	~45
Isoform X3	XP_054176600	375	~43

Table 1. These are the five protein isoforms of TMEM145.

Transmembrane protein 145 isoform 1 is rich in phenylalanine and tyrosine. The subcellular localization of the human TMEM145 protein is the plasma membrane and cytoskeleton. This protein has a signal peptide from amino acid 1-29 and a cleavage site between amino acid 29 and 30. TMEM145 contains a GOLD domain (Golgi dynamics) and a seven-transmembrane domain. The transmembrane domain is a Rhodopsin-like GPCR Transmembrane Domain.

== Evolution/Homology ==
=== Paralog ===
TMEM145 is paralogous to integral membrane protein GPR180 (G-protein coupled receptor). GPR180 is produced in vascular smooth muscle cells.

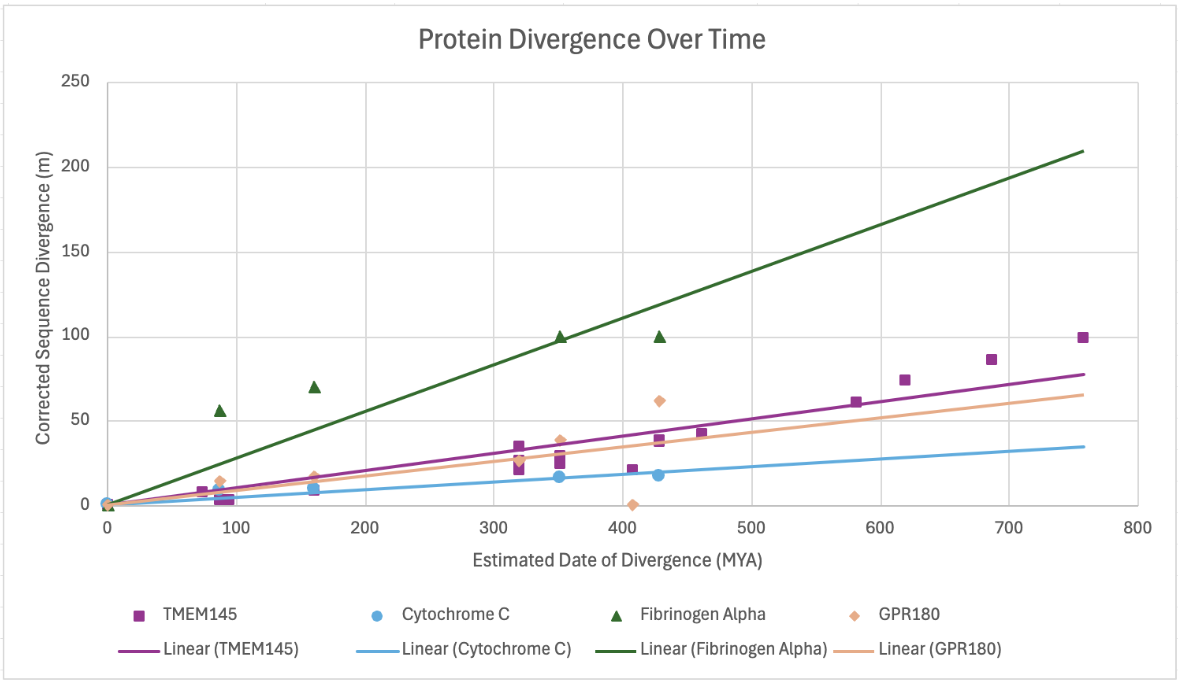
TMEM145 evolution rate. Protein divergence over time for TMEM145 and its paralog, GPR180 compared to Cytochrome C and Fibrinogen Alpha. TMEM145 mutates more slowly than Fibrinogen Alpha but more quickly than Cytochrome C. TMEM145 has a higher rate of sequence divergence than GPR180. The data points for Cytochrome C, Fibrinogen Alpha, and GPR180 are based on different orthologs including Homo sapiens, Mus musculus, Phascolarctos cinereus, Eleutherodactylus coqui, and Danio rerio. GPR180 also included Cuculus canorus. All data points for TMEM145 come from orthologs listed in Table 2.

=== Orthologs ===
Homo sapiens TMEM145 gene orthologs are found in mammals, birds, reptiles, amphibians, fish, and invertebrates. Table 2 displays some orthologs of TMEM145.

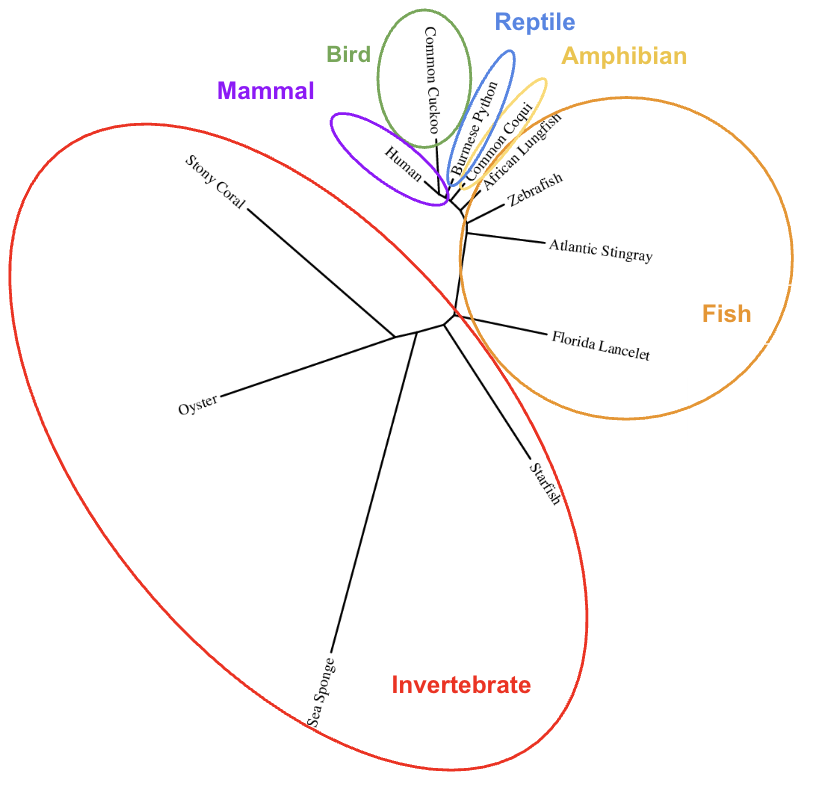
TMEM145 unrooted phylogenetic tree. This is an inexhaustive tree. The circles group organisms according to taxonomy.

Genus and Species	Common Name	Taxonomic Group	Date of Divergence From the Human Lineage (*MYA)	Accession Number	Sequence Length	Sequence Identity to Human Protein (%)	Sequence Similarity to Human Protein (%)
Homo sapiens	Humans	Primate	0	NP_001353839	563	100	100
Microcebus murinus	Grey Mouse Lemur	Primate	74	XP_012613964.1	596	92.45	93.1
Mus musculus	House Mouse	Rodentia	87	NP_001390132.1	563	96.63	97.2
Rhinolophus ferrumequinum	Greater Horseshoe Bat	Chiroptera	94	XP_032985445.1	563	97.16	98.4
Phascolarctos cinereus	Koala	Diprotodontia	160	XP_020858946.1	573	92	76.9
Dermochelys coriacea	Leatherback Sea Turtle	Testudines	319	XP_038239097	545	77.86	80.6
Cuculus canorus	Common Cuckoo	Cuculiformes	319	XP_053908563.1	557	70.76	77.1
Python bivittatus	Burmese Python	Squamata	319	XP_007430515.2	591	76.65	75.7
Apteryx mantelli	North Island Brown Kiwi	Apterygiformes	319	XP_067172958.1	563	81.17	83
Rhinatrema bivittatum	Two-lined Caecilian	Gymnophiona	352	XP_029432757.1	546	77.84	81.3
Eleutherodactylus coqui	Puerto Rican Coqui	Anura	352	XM_066607125.1	547	75.09	79.3
Bufotes viridis	European Green Toad	Anura	352	CAK8626328.1	547	74.53	77.9
Protopterus annectens	West African Lungfish	Ceratodontiformes	408	XP_043936719.1	588	80.82	72.6
Danio rerio	Zebrafish	Cypriniformes	429	XP_686062.6	579	68.72	71.6
Amphiprion ocellaris	Clown Anemonefish	Perciformes	429	XP_023119489.1	551	67.75	73.7
Hypanus sabinus	Atlantic Stingray	Myliobatiformes	462	XP_059824187.1	534	65.48	67.7
Branchiostoma floridae	Florida Lancelet	Amphioxiformes	581	XP_035675017.1	550	54.53	59.1
Acanthaster planci	Crown-of-thorns Starfish	Valvatida	619	XP_022093045.1	584	47.73	58.5
Saccostrea echinata	Blacklip Rock Oyster	Ostreida	686	XP_061193107.1	567	42.22	55.8
Oscarella lobularis	Sea Sponge	Homosclerophorida	758	XP_065845639.1	523	37.29	55.5

Table 2. Incomplete list of orthologs of human TMEM145 (*MYA = millions of years ago).

== Clinical Significance ==
An African ancestry-specific allele (rs10423769_A) is a genetic variant affecting alternative splicing for the TMEM145 gene. A protective interaction between this allele and the APOE ε4 allele lowered the odds for Alzheimer's Disease by 75% in APOE ε4 heterozygous carriers. The TMEM145 isoforms were found to be more expressed in the cerebellum than the frontal cortex, suggesting that TMEM145 plays a more significant role in the cerebellum. In studying the bone metastasis-derived PC3 prostate cancer cell line, TMEM145 was one of four genes deleted from chromosome 19 in a homozygous deletion. Upon analyzing the DNA methylation pattern, TMEM145 was found to be hypermethylated during stages 1, 2, and 3 of breast cancer, meaning it may be involved in breast cancer control mechanisms. TMEM145 was one of several genes that were highly up-regulated (>10 fold) in both mouse adrenal tumor and human pheochromocytoma.
