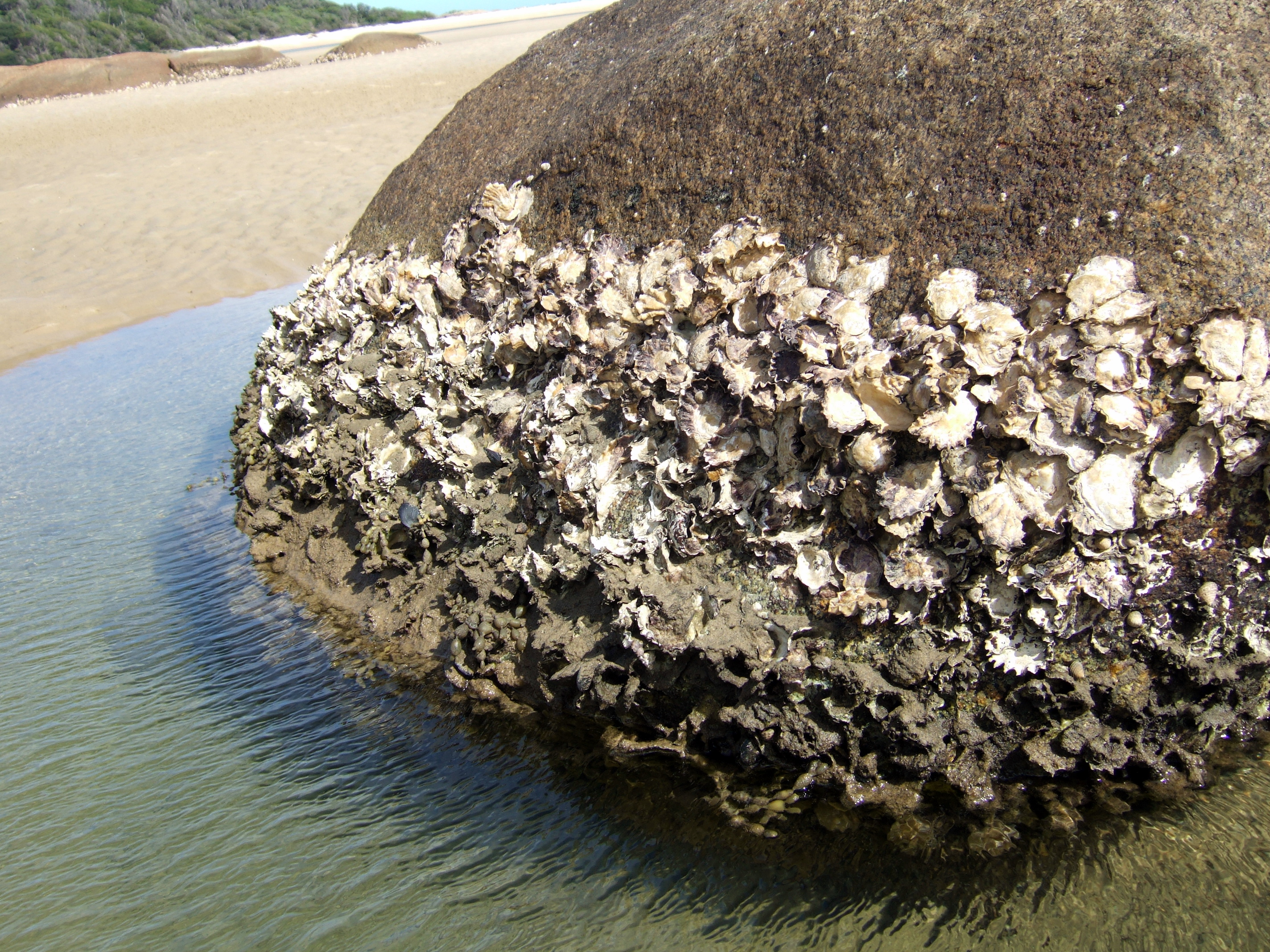

Scientific classification
- Kingdom: Animalia
- Phylum: Mollusca
- Class: Bivalvia
- Order: Ostreida
- Superfamily: Ostreoidea
- Family: Ostreidae
- Genus: Saccostrea; Dollfus & Dautzenberg, 1920

Type species
- † Ostrea saccellus Dujardin, 1837

Synonyms
- Ostrea (Saccostrea) Dollfus & Dautzenberg, 1920; Parastriostrea Harry, 1985; Saxostrea Iredale, 1936

= Rock oyster =

Genus of bivalves

Rock oysters are true oysters of the genus Saccostrea, belonging to the subfamily Saccostreinae of the family Ostreidae. Depending on the environmental factors and the substrates it is found in, individuals can vary greatly in size. They feed on phytoplankton and detritus.

Probably the best-known species is the Sydney rock oyster (Saccostrea glomerata).

== Distribution ==
They are widely distributed in tropical and subtropical regions. They are common along the rocky shores of the Indo-Pacific region. Their range includes East Africa, Japan, Taiwan, China, Vietnam, Singapore, Australia and New Zealand.

== Taxonomy ==
Saccostrea is a genus which belongs to the subfamily Saccostreinae which further belongs to the family Ostreidae (rock oysters). Other genera within this family include Ostrea and Lopha of the subfamily Ostreinae and Crassostrea of the subfamily Crassostreinae.

The taxonomic classification and phylogenetic relationships of oyster species is not exactly known and this is particularly true for this genus. This uncertainty is due to the morphological plasticity members of this genus show along with significantly differing shell morphology based on its life stage and habitat condition. Traditional methods of figuring out its taxonomy are difficult. These methods can only recognize one species within the Indo-Pacific region (S. cucullata) with S. kegaki being the only species readily distinguished.

=== Phylogeny ===
Current work suggests that this genus contains two major lineages. The first is the S. cucullata complex. Included in this complex is S. kegaki and S. glomerata. The second lineage is the S. mordax complex.

=== Taxonomic history ===
Saccostrea has been placed in either the subfamily Ostreinae or Crassostreinae. However a new subfamily was erected by Salvi et al. (2014) named Saccostreinae which also tentatively included Striostrea as a member (it would later be placed within its own subfamily Striostreinae by Raith et al. 2015).

== Species ==
The World Register of Marine Species lists these species:

- Saccostrea circumsuta (Gould, 1850)
- Saccostrea cucullata (Born, 1778) – hooded oyster
- Saccostrea echinata (Quoy & Gaimard, 1835) – tropical black-lip rock oyster
- Saccostrea glomerata (Gould, 1850) - Sydney rock oyster
- Saccostrea kegaki Torigoe & Inaba, 1981
- Saccostrea malabonensis (Faustino, 1932) – Philippine hooded oyster (talabang kukong kabayo)
- Saccostrea mordoides Z.-M. Cui, L.-S. Hu, C. Li, Z. Zhang, X.-M. Guo & H.-Y. Wang, 2021
- Saccostrea palmula (Carpenter, 1857)
- † Saccostrea saccellus (Dujardin, 1837)
- Saccostrea scyphophilla (Peron & Lesueur, 1807)
- Saccostrea spathulata (Lamarck, 1819)
- Saccostrea subtrigona (G.B. Sowerby II, 1871)
- † Saccostrea virleti (Deshayes, 1835)

Synonyms

- Saccostrea commercialis (Iredale & Roughley, 1933): synonym of Saccostrea glomerata (Gould, 1850)
- Saccostrea cucullata [sic]: synonym of Saccostrea cuccullata (Born, 1778) (misspelling)
- Saccostrea forskahlii (Gmelin, 1791): synonym of Saccostrea cuccullata (Born, 1778)
- Saccostrea margaritacea (Lamarck, 1819): synonym of Striostrea margaritacea (Lamarck, 1819)
- Saccostrea mordax (Gould, 1850): synonym of Saccostrea scyphophilla (Peron & Lesueur, 1807)
- Saccostrea tubulifera (Dall, 1914): synonym of Saccostrea palmula (Carpenter, 1857)
