= Royal Regalia Museum =

Museum in Brunei

- Muzium Alat Kebesaran Diraja
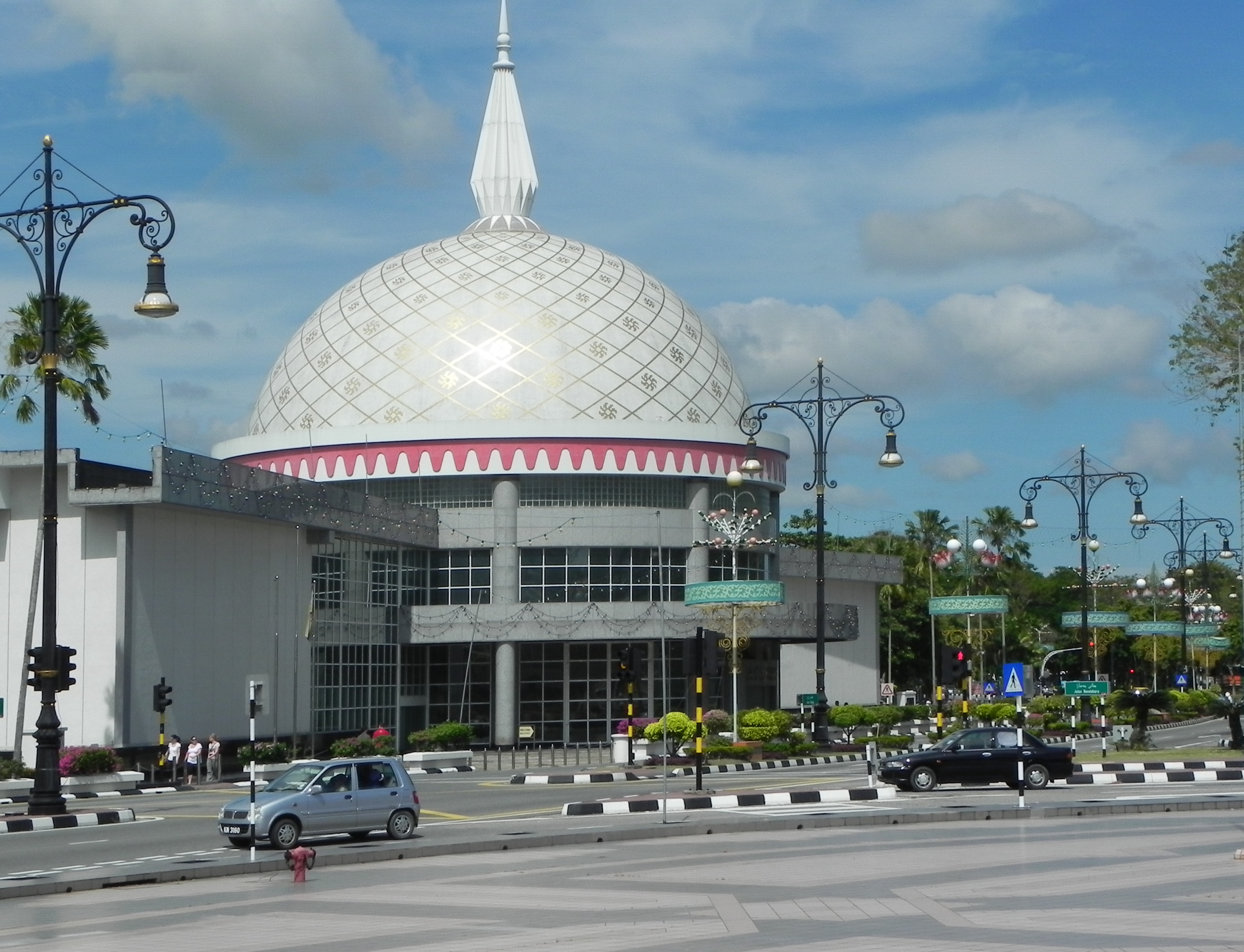
- Royal Regalia Museum in 2010
- Former names: Royal Regalia Building (1992–2017)
- Established: 30 September 1992
- Location: Jalan Sultan Omar Ali Saifuddien, Pusat Bandar, Bandar Seri Begawan, Brunei
- Coordinates: 4°53′34″N 114°56′30″E
- Type: History museum
- Collections: Royal regalia and antiques
- Visitors: 29,735 (2020)
- Founder: Sultan Hassanal Bolkiah
- Parking: On site (no charge)

The Royal Regalia Museum (Malay: Muzium Alat Kebesaran Diraja) is a museum located in the heart of Bandar Seri Begawan, the capital of Brunei. Originally built as a monument in 1965, the museum had a makeover and expansion in 1992 that combined constructivist and Melayu Islam Beraja (MIB) architectural elements. Originally constructed as a monument, Royal Regalia Building (Muzium Alat Kebesaran Diraja) later underwent a transition into a museum. The building, which still has some of its original features intact, currently houses historical antiques and royal regalia from Brunei, signifying the country's rich cultural legacy and royal customs.

== History ==
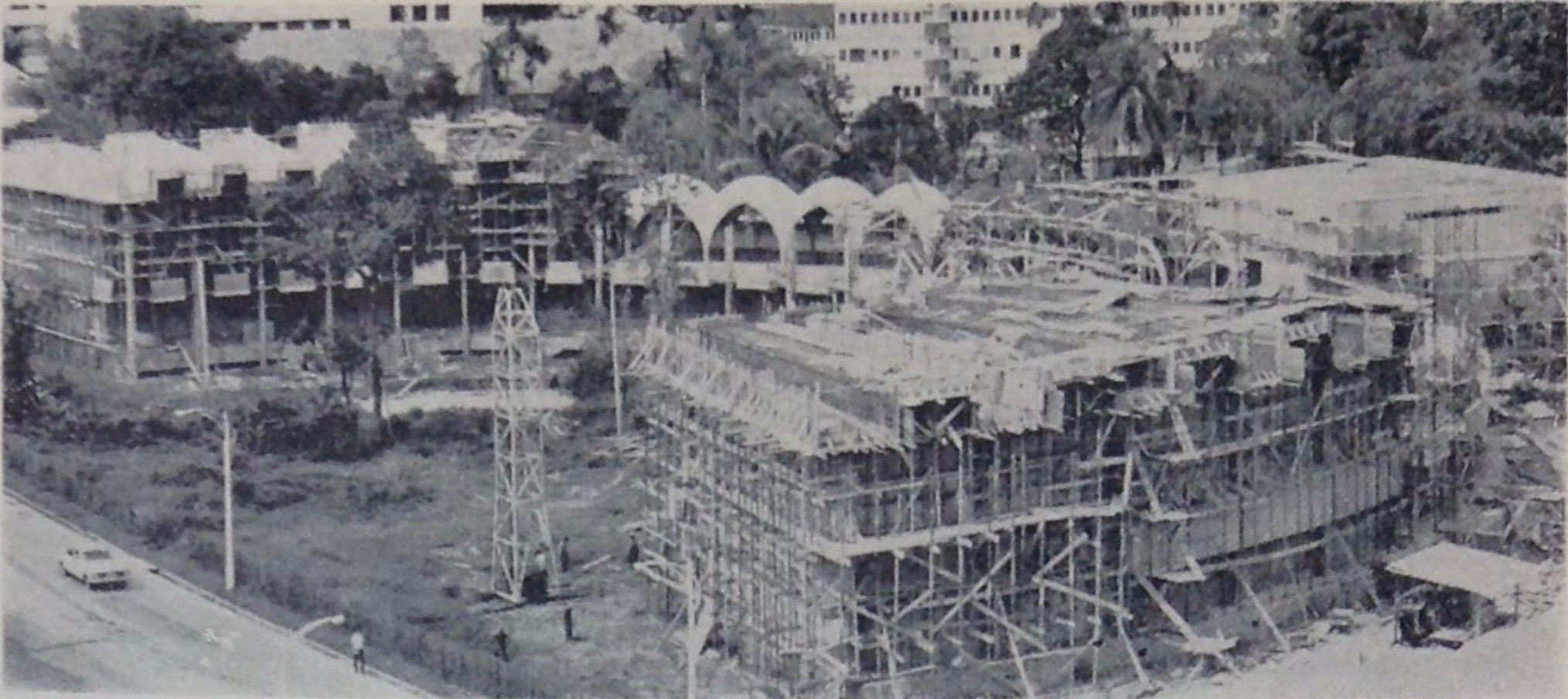
Construction underway in 1970

Since construction began in 1969, about 80% has been completed by 1970. The building complex cost an estimated B$3.35 million. The building was opened in 1971, originally as Churchill Memorial Building. At that time it was the only museum in the world dedicated to commemorate Winston Churchill, although Brunei was regarded an unlikely place as he had never visited the country. It was commissioned by Sultan Omar Ali Saifuddien III, known to be a great admirer of the British prime minister albeit the Sultan only met him once when he was in London at one time. The opening ceremony was attended by Churchill's daughter Mary Soames.

Apart from the memorial museum, the building also housed the Hassanal Bolkiah Aquarium, then Brunei's historical and cultural centre, the office of the Department of Fisheries, and a lecture hall. The building then had a 8 feet (2.4 m)-tall bronze statue of Churchill himself posing with the V sign. The statue stood on top of a granite base which had an inscription of a quote by Churchill himself:

These are not dark days.

They are great days.

— Winston S. Churchill

In 1983, the two-story building with a crescent shape was transformed for the exhibition titled "History and Evolution of the Constitution of Brunei Darussalam." Renovations on the building began in early 1992, and it took eight months of work before the Royal Regalia Building was completed. The Melayu Islam Beraja (MIB) philosophy, which was the inspiration for the museum's conception. A group of engineers and architects worked together with the Ministry of Culture, Youth, and Sports. Additionally, the statue of Winston Churchill was removed and put into storage. It was converted in conjunction with the silver jubilee celebration of Sultan Hassanal Bolkiah's ascension to the throne. The museum opened its doors on 30 September 1992. Royal regalia, the Sultan's mementos, and exhibits detailing the country's constitutional history were housed there.

Since 2 December 2017, the building has been renamed to the Royal Regalia Museum, in conjunction with the Golden Jubilee Celebration of Sultan Hassanal Bolkiah's ascension to the throne.

== Design and architecture ==
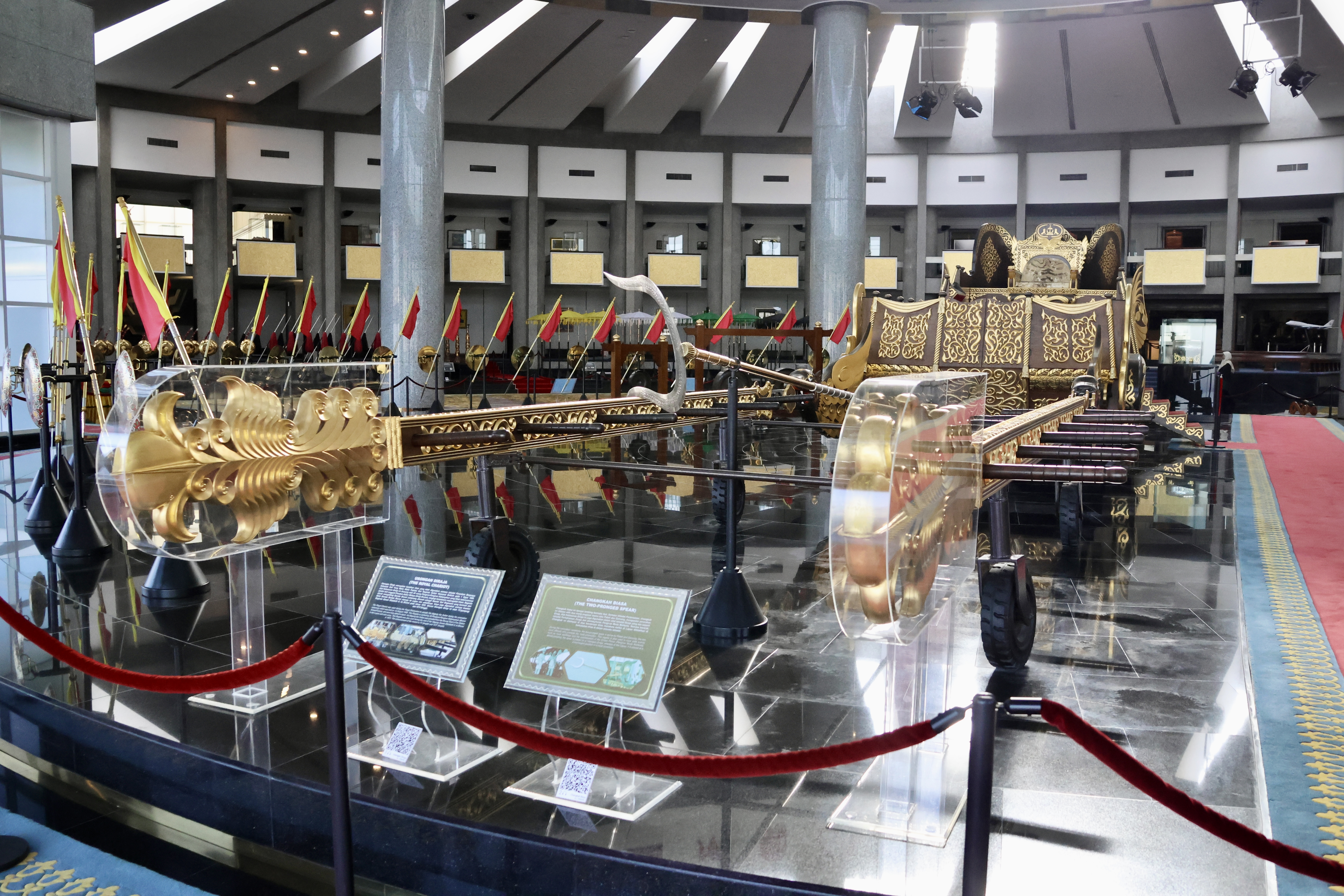
The usongan diraja on display

The Royal Regalia Museum's architecture and design pay homage to Melayu Islam Beraja (MIB). The memorial building's unique crescent form was maintained while the museum was being built, and original 1960s features including walls, stairs, verandahs, and banisters were integrated into the new structure. The architecture of the museum expands smoothly from the original C-shaped structure, creating a dome-capped section and a semi-circular atrium. This fusion of ancient and modern architecture stands for both innovation and continuity. The dome, which is the main feature, is decorated with golden flower mosaics called bunga putar, which mirror the clothing of the Sultan. The 13.5 metres (44 ft) white spire of the dome, which symbolises protection and vigilance in Brunei's royal regalia, is shaped like an umbrella and draws inspiration from traditional Pemanjangan found in Istana Nurul Iman.

The museum's main doors that are modelled by the kalasak (long blade) design. The Royal Regalia Gallery, housed in the main gallery with Black Assoluto granite flooring, features ceremonial objects used at the 1968 Coronation Ceremony. Handwoven carpets with elaborate designs like the pucuk rebung, and the ayer muleh. Thirteen sets of royal decorations, such as the Ambal, Payung Ubur-Ubur, Tunggul Kawan, and Dadap, which are all a part of the royal heraldry passed down via Brunei's royalty, are adorning the interior ribs of the dome surrounding the ring beam. The taming (royal shield), is on exhibit on the dome's ceiling. The gallery doors include the kampilan (sword) and kelasak (shield). The entry doors are decorated with the kalasak pattern. The 1992 usongan diraja (royal chariot), and the singgahsana (throne room) and Pemanjangan replicas are the gallery's most prized possessions. There is also a second chariot which was used during the 1968 coronation and also during the 1972 Queen Elizabeth II's visit to Brunei.

Exhibits include the artifacts that were used for royal ceremonies in the country, the gold and silver ceremonial weaponry, crowns embedded with jewels, and other paraphernalia that formed part of the coronation ceremonies, and ceremonial costumes. There is an exhibit of a golden hand and forearm that the Sultan used as a prop for his chin at his coronation and an ornate crown, as well as exhibits of "documents and treaties" in the Constitutional Gallery. The Golden Jubilee Exhibition Gallery has a contemporary, interactive design with white and yellow LED lighting. The walls are covered with large photos documenting significant national events and advancements over the Sultan's 75-year reign, along with recollections of his relationship with the populace. There are projections of audio and video from Brunei's Independence Day and his coronation.

== See also ==
- List of museums in Brunei

== Bibliography ==
- Alexander, James (2006). Malaysia, Brunei and Singapore. New Holland Publishers. ISBN 978-1-86011-309-3.
- de Ledesma, Charles; Lewis, Mark; Savage, Pauline (2003). Malaysia, Singapore and Brunei. Rough Guides. ISBN 978-1-84353-094-7.
- Hutton, Wendy (November 2000). Adventure Guides: East Malaysia. Tuttle Publishing. ISBN 978-962-593-180-7.
- Menon, K.U. (1987). "BRUNEI DARUSSALAM IN 1986: In Search of the Political Kingdom". Southeast Asian Affairs. 1987. ISEAS–Yusof Ishak Institute: 85–101. JSTOR 27908570.
- IBP (7 February 2007). Brunei Air Force Handbook. International Business Publications. ISBN 978-1-4330-0429-2.
