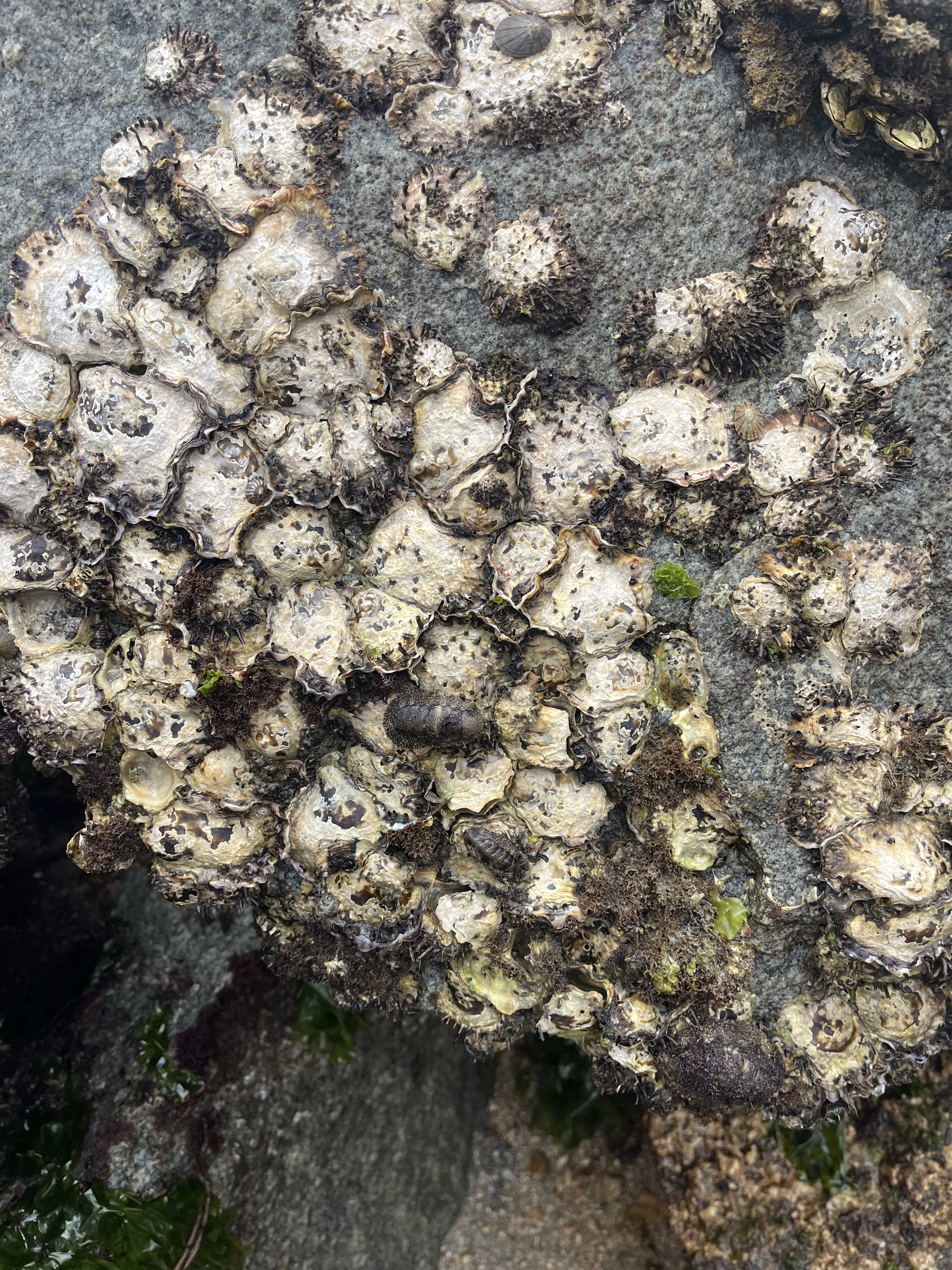
- Cluster of Saccostrea kegaki on a rock on the island of Teshima (豊島), Japan

Conservation status
- Least Concern (IUCN 3.1)

Scientific classification
- Kingdom: Animalia
- Phylum: Mollusca
- Class: Bivalvia
- Order: Ostreida
- Family: Ostreidae
- Genus: Saccostrea
- Species: S. kegaki

Binomial name
- Saccostrea kegaki Torigoe & Inaba, 1981

= Saccostrea kegaki =

Species of bivalve

Saccostrea kegaki, the Japanese spiny oyster, is a species of rock oyster in the family Ostreidae.

== Description ==
Saccostrea kegaki is a small encrusting oyster with its shell only reaching a length of 2 to 5 cm. It is characterized by black, dense, pipe-like spines clustered on the right valve and margin of the left valve. The rest of the shell is typically white. Radial ribs and shell plication are not prominent.

== Distribution ==
Saccostrea kegaki is found in western Japan, the Korean Peninsula, and Taiwan.

== Ecology ==
Saccostrea kegaki are often found in middle intertidal rocky shores, except in standing tide pools.

The pea crab, Pinnotheres boninensis, is a known parasite of S. kegaki and decreases the oyster's body weight and reproductive abilities.
