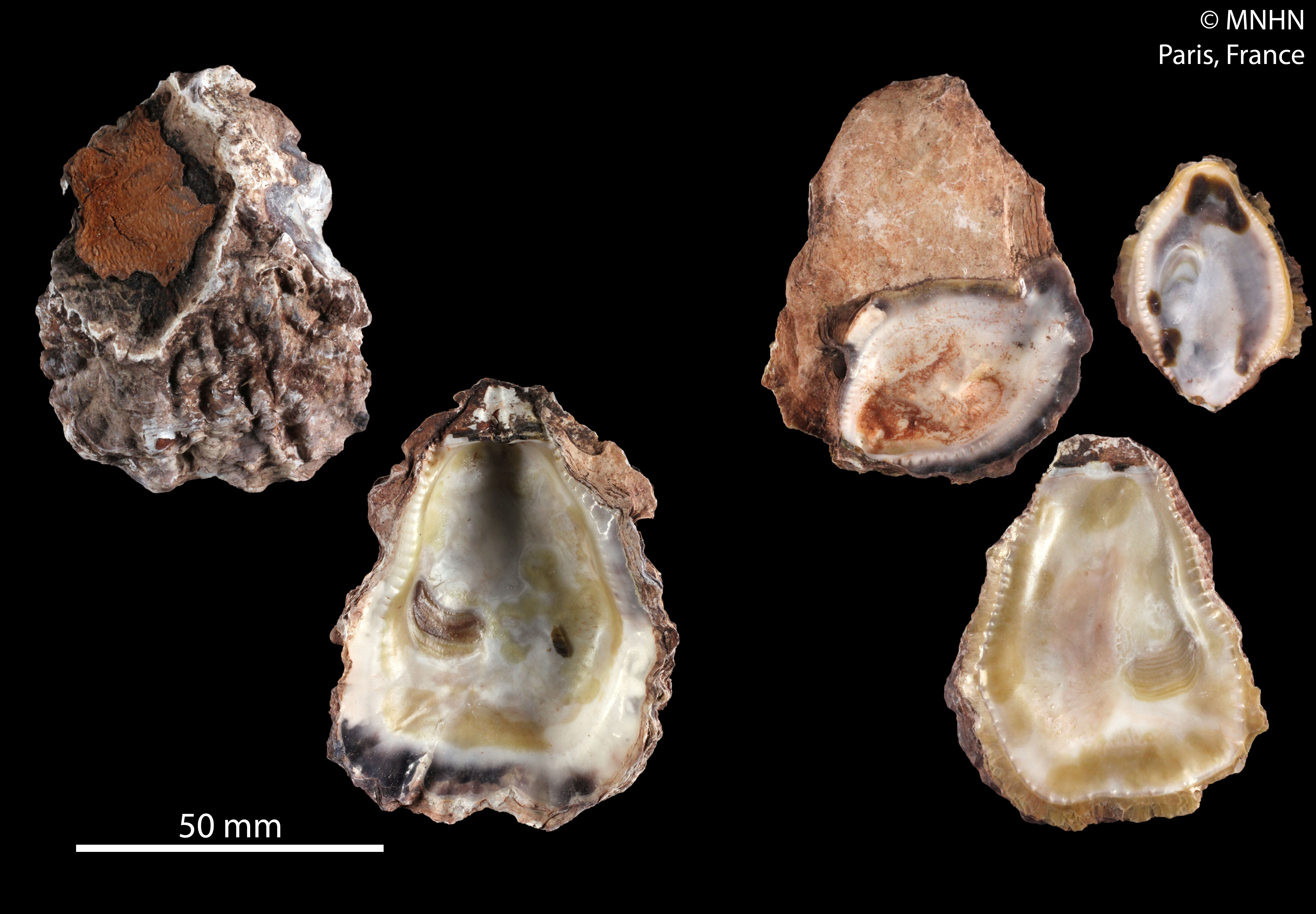
- Shell of Saccostrea cuccullata (specimen at MNHN, Paris)

Scientific classification
- Kingdom: Animalia
- Phylum: Mollusca
- Class: Bivalvia
- Order: Ostreida
- Family: Ostreidae
- Genus: Saccostrea
- Species: S. cucullata

Binomial name
- Saccostrea cucullata (Born, 1778)

Synonyms
- Crassostrea cucullata (Born); Dioeciostrea subtropica Orton, 1928; Ostrea cornucopiae Gmelin, 1791; Ostrea cucullata Born, 1778; Ostrea forskali Gmelin, 1791; Ostrea gibbosa Lamarck, 1819; Ostrea purpurea Lightfoot, 1786; Ostrea saccellus Dujardin, 1835; Ostrea stellata Gmelin, 1791; Ostrea turbinata Lamarck, 1819

= Saccostrea cucullata =

Species of bivalve

Saccostrea cucullata, the hooded oyster or Natal rock oyster, is a species of rock oyster found mainly in the Indo-Pacific Ocean.

It was first described by the Czech mineralogist, metallurgist, and malacologist Ignaz von Born in 1778.

== Description ==
Left valve of a fossil specimen from the Pliocene

The appearance and form of the hooded oyster is very variable. The shape is sometimes nearly circular or it may be oblong or roughly oval, often with an irregular outline. In the Mediterranean, it grows to 4 to 6 cm (1.6 to 2.4 in), but achieves double that size in the Pacific Ocean. The valves are thick and solid. The lower valve is convex and has no sculpturing near the umbo, which is fixed to the substrate. The upper valve is flat and smaller than the lower valve. It may have wide, sometimes spiny, ribs but is sometimes quite smooth. The margins of the valves are pleated and fit together neatly. The ligament is internal and no teeth occur on the hinge joint. The right valve has some small denticles on its margin which fit into grooves in the left valve margin. A single large adductor muscle holds the valves together, resulting in a large, kidney-shaped scar on the inside of each valve. The colour is purplish-brown on the outside of the valves. The inside is white rimmed with black. This oyster could be confused with the Pacific oyster (Crassostrea gigas), but is distinguished by having a crenulated margin.

== Distribution and habitat ==
The hooded oyster is found in the Indian Ocean and tropical west Pacific Ocean. In East Africa, its range includes Somalia, Kenya, Tanzania, and the Seychelles. In India, it is one of a number of commercially exploited oyster species. It is also found in Australia, New Zealand, and the Red Sea. It was first seen in Turkey in 1999 and seems to have become established in the eastern end of the Mediterranean. It is also available in the intertidal areas like Kutubdia Island, Maheshkhali Island, and Saint Martin's Island of Bangladesh. It favours rocky habitats in the intertidal zone, and is found at depths down to about 15 m (49 ft), often growing among seaweed. It is part of the fouling community and is found on harbour walls, pilings, and other underwater structures.

== Biology ==
The hooded oyster is a filter feeder, pumping water through its gills and removing the phytoplankton. In polluted waters, it accumulates heavy metals in its tissues. For this reason it can be used as a bioindicator for monitoring pollution. Because it selectively removes these metals and is such an efficient biofilter, it has been used in the Persian Gulf to control pollution.

The hooded oyster is tolerant of a wide range of temperatures and salinities. Breeding takes place between June and October in the Northern Hemisphere. The larvae are planktonic and preferentially settle out of the water column in locations already occupied by adult oysters.

== Ecology ==
The hooded oyster is common on the east coast of Africa, where it cements itself to rocks or to the branches and roots of mangroves. It sometimes even grows on the shell of a large gastropod mollusc, the mangrove whelk (Terebralia palustris), which grazes beneath the mangrove canopy. In Australia, another gastropod, the black oyster borer or mulberry whelk (Tenguella marginalba, previously Morula marginalba) feeds on the oyster by drilling a hole through its shell. It then inserts its radula and chews up the body before sucking out the pieces.
