= Fishing industry in Brunei =

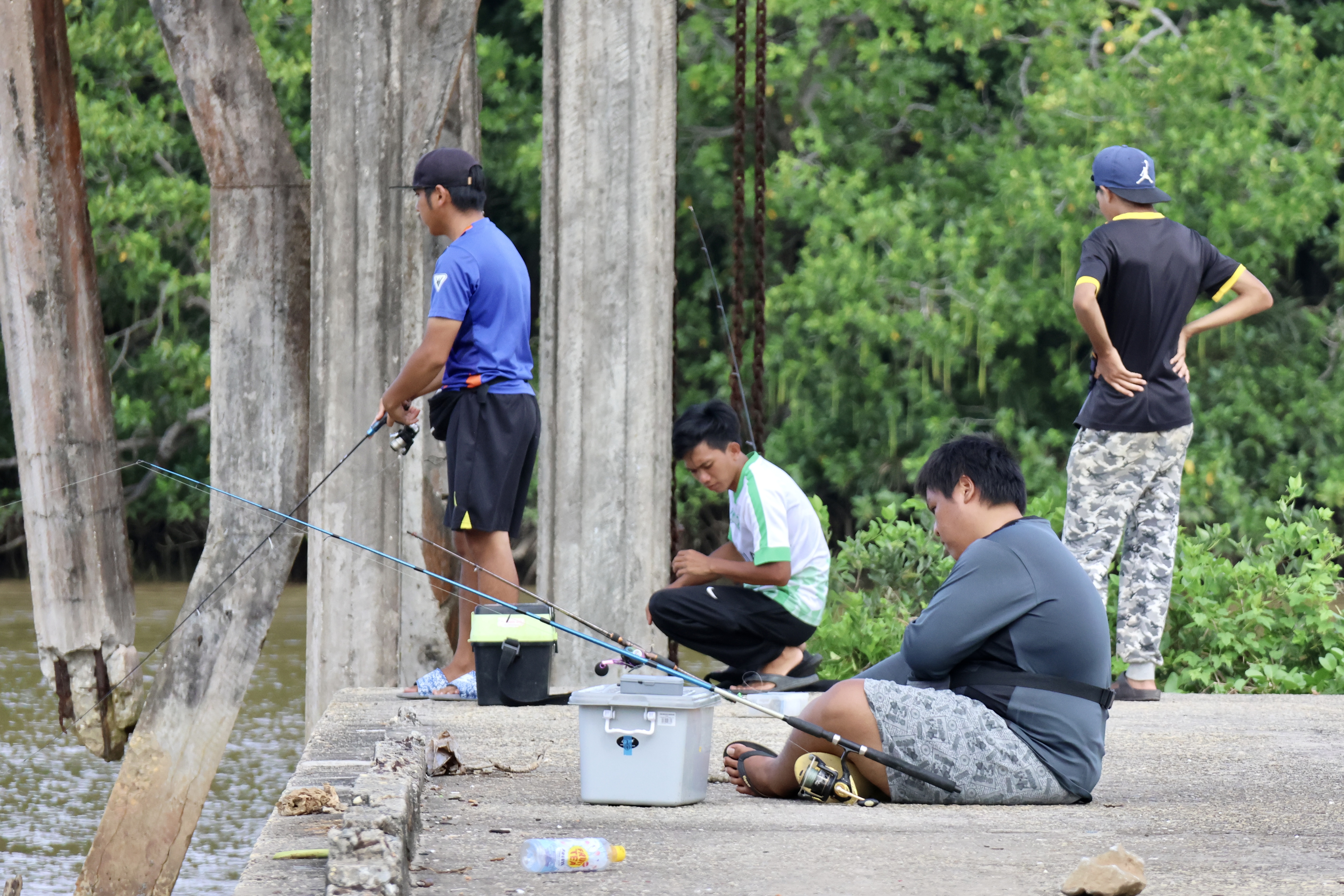
Bruneian fishermen at the Danau Jetty in 2023.

The fishing industry in Brunei is one of the largest contributors of the country's revenue. Fishing is a major source of protein in the diets of the Brunei people. The coastal location on the island of Borneo makes it an ideal location for commercial and subsistence fishing.

Most of the fishing grounds in Brunei are in proximity to the mangrove swamps of Brunei estuaries where there are abundant nutrients for fish to reproduce. Some rare marine species have been captured locally, like the recent blackish green toman caught by local fish enthusiasts by using modern fishing technology.

Many Bruneians live in Kampong Ayer or Water Village, an area of Brunei's capital city, Bandar Seri Begawan, where houses built on stilts above the Brunei River grant easy access to the open water.

Large scale commercial fishing usually involves exporting fresh fish caught to neighbouring countries like China and Taiwan like the recent breeding of the highly demanded fish species like the mouse grouper and coral trout in which the market price is B$160 per kilogram if sold to China and Taiwan. Small scale commercial fishing usually involves the selling of fish caught in the wet market.

== Methods of fishing ==
=== Drift net fishing ===
The net (rantau) hangs from buoys (patau) which float on the surface of the water. This method of fishing is used to catch fish like tamban (sardines) which swim in shoals near the surface. Drift net fishing usually takes place at night and in the early morning, and is an offshore fishing method.

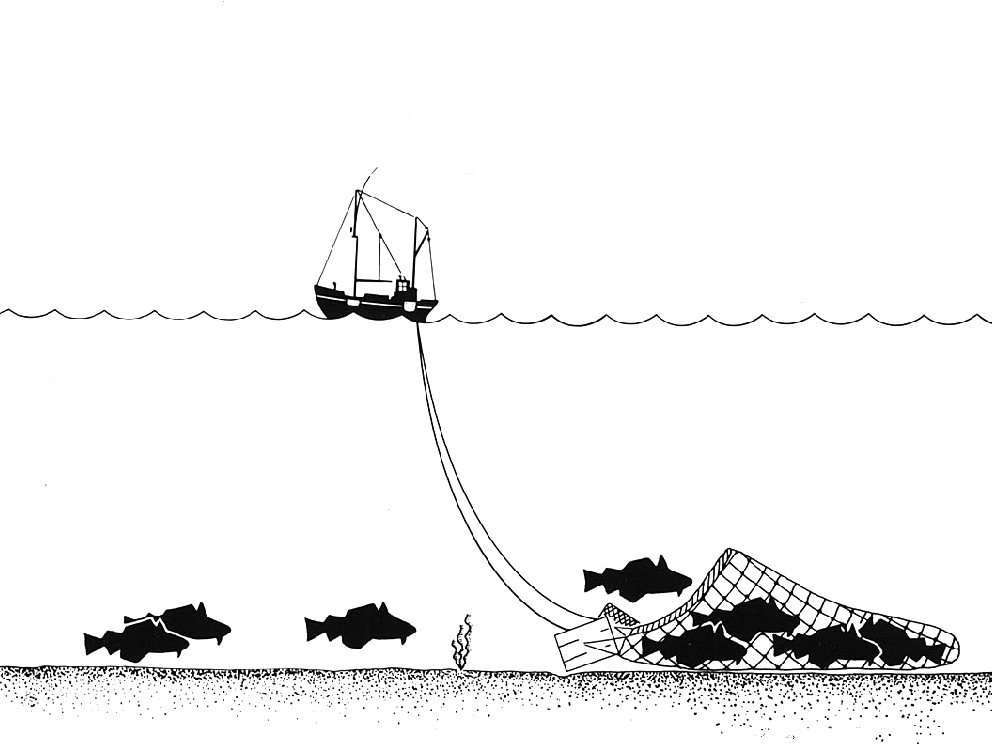
Trawling

=== Trawling ===
In deep sea trawling, the net is dragged along the sea bed using the fishing boats called trawlers. This technique is used both for inshore and offshore commercial fisheries.

=== Bubu ===
A bubu is a large box- or conical-shaped trap used to catch large fish like red snapper and grouper. The traps are set up in the area of coral reefs, and weighted down with heavy stones so that the trap can sink to the sea bed.

=== Bintur ===
The bintur is a lift net of bamboo and netting used to catch crabs. It is usually used in brackish water and freshwater inshore fishing.

=== Lintau and Kelong ===
Lintaus and kelongs are fish corrals designed to direct fish into a fenced-in area in the sea. A lintau is used along mudflats near mangroves, while the kelong is set up in the deeper waters of the estuaries.

== Fish caught ==
- Bebatik (golden trevally)
- Kerapu (Grouper)
- Duai Hitam (black pomfret)
- Duai Putih (white pomfret)
- Ikan Merah (Red Snapper)
- Belanak (mullet)
- Keli (Catfish)
- Temanong (yellowtail scad)
- Tengiri Gelama
- Ayam Laut (triggerfish)
- Kitang (scat)
- Tilapia
- Pusu(Anchovy)
- Rumahan Laki
- Rumahan Bini (shortbodied mackerel)
- Bilis (ponyfish)
- Tamban
- Yu (Shark)
- Pari (Stingray)
- Sumpit-sumpit (Archerfish)
- Udang Bekara Lobster
- Udang Prawn
- Ketam Crab
- Mussel
- Squid

== Fishing locations ==
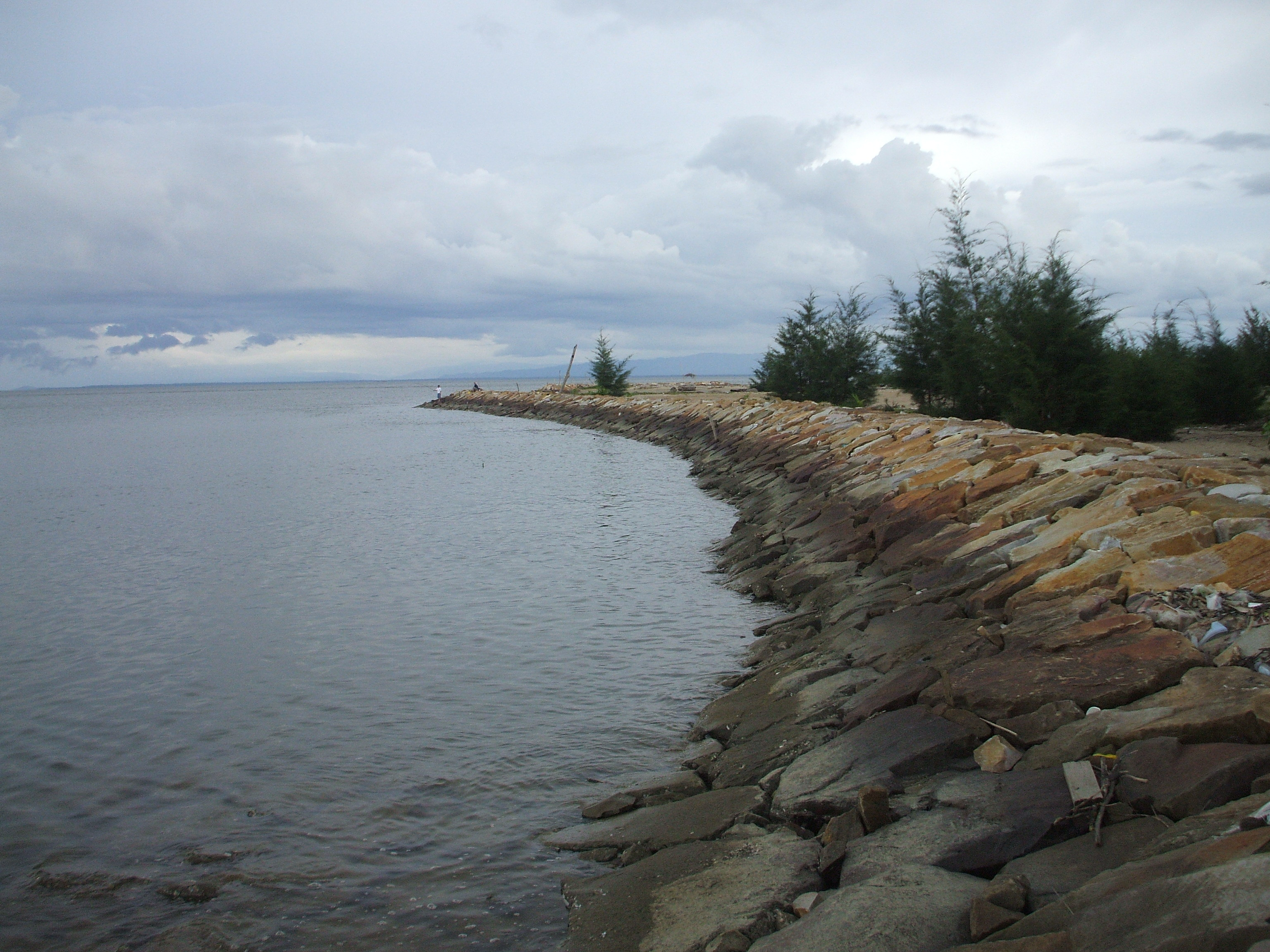
Serasa Beach

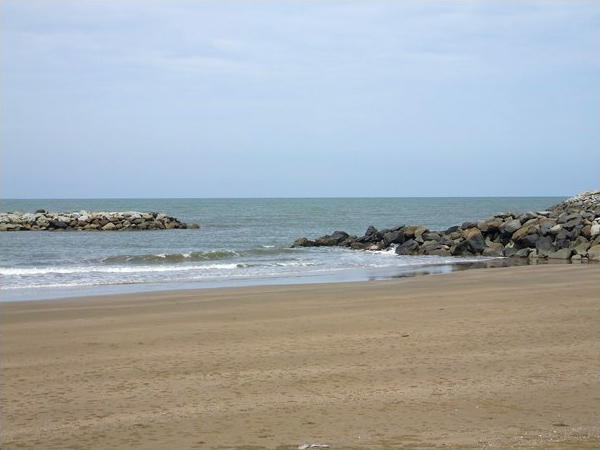
Jerudong Beach

== Problems ==
The annual catch in Brunei fisheries fluctuates. This has caused Brunei to import fish from other South China Sea fisheries such as neighboring Malaysia, Sabah and Sarawak.

Coral reefs off Brunei, as elsewhere, are the main breeding grounds for fish and are threatened due to overfishing.
