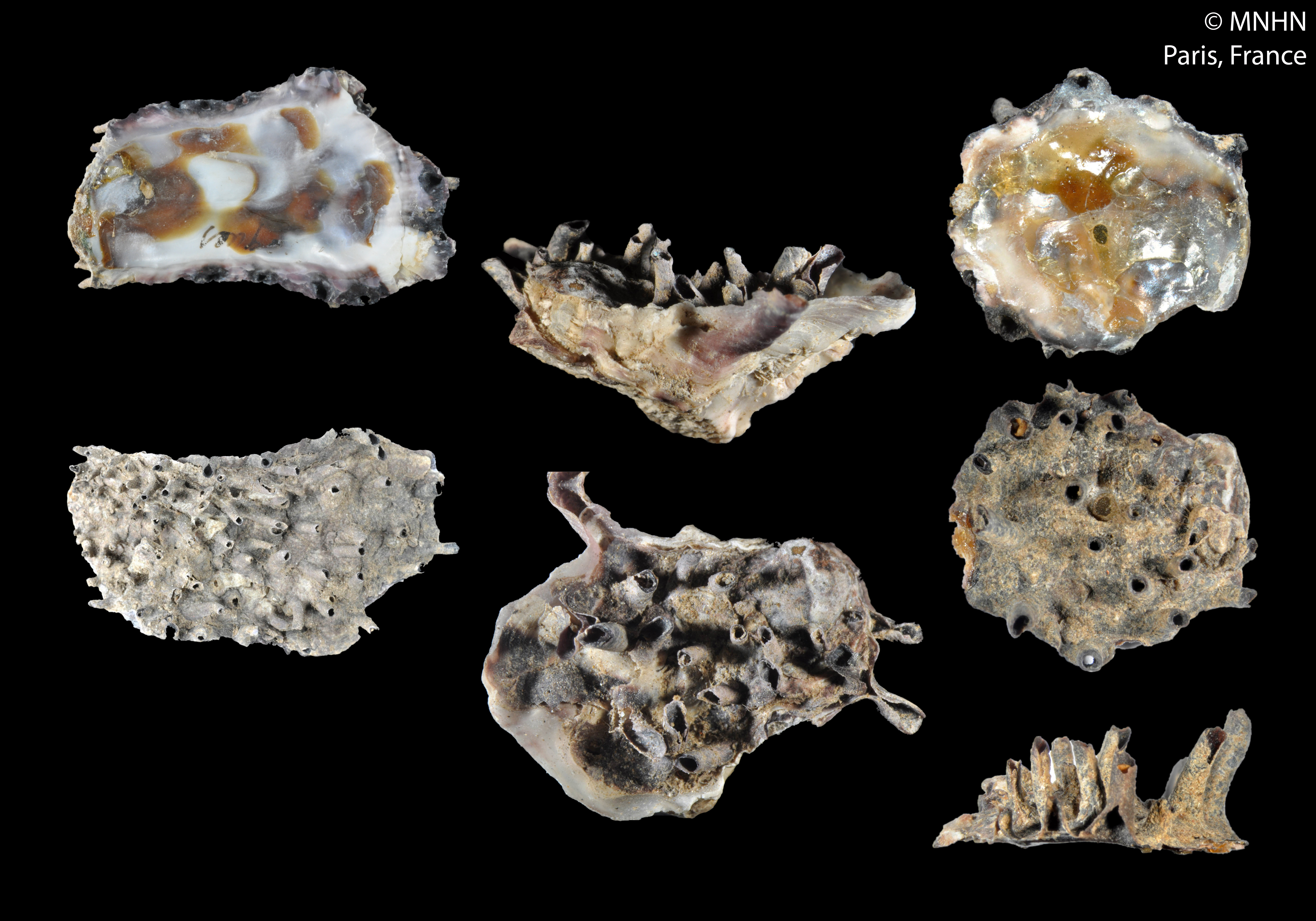
- Shell of Saccostrea echinata (syntype at MNHN, Paris)

Scientific classification
- Kingdom: Animalia
- Phylum: Mollusca
- Class: Bivalvia
- Order: Ostreida
- Family: Ostreidae
- Genus: Saccostrea
- Species: S. echinata

Binomial name
- Saccostrea echinata Quoy & Gaimard, 1835)

Synonyms
- Ostrea echinata Quoy & Gaimard, 1835; Crassostrea echinata Quoy & Gaimard, 1835; Ostraea arakanensis G. B. Sowerby II, 1871; Ostraea nigromarginata G. B. Sowerby II, 1871; Ostrea echinata Quoy & Gaimard, 1835 (original combination); Ostrea mytiloides Lamarck, 1819; Ostrea spinosa Deshayes, 1836; Saxostrea gradiva Iredale, 1939

= Saccostrea echinata =

Tropical black-lip rock oyster, found in the Indo-Pacific

Saccostrea echinata, commonly known as the tropical black-lip rock oyster, blacklip rock oyster, blacklip oyster, and spiny rock oyster, is one of several tropical rock oyster species, occurring in tropical seas across the Indo-Pacific, including coastal waters across northern Australia to Noumea.

The history of Indigenous Australians' harvesting of the oysters goes back many generations, as evidenced by the numerous shell middens along Australia's northern coastline. More recently, the wild oysters have been collected off the rocks and bottled for sale.

== Description ==
A 2019 study on the reproductive cycles of three populations of the oyster in the Northern territory showed that it is probably a dioecious species, occasionally functioning as hermaphrodites. A major finding was that the species spawns almost continuously during the wet season from October to April, while it rests for the rest of the year, during the dry season.

Right and left valve of the same specimen:

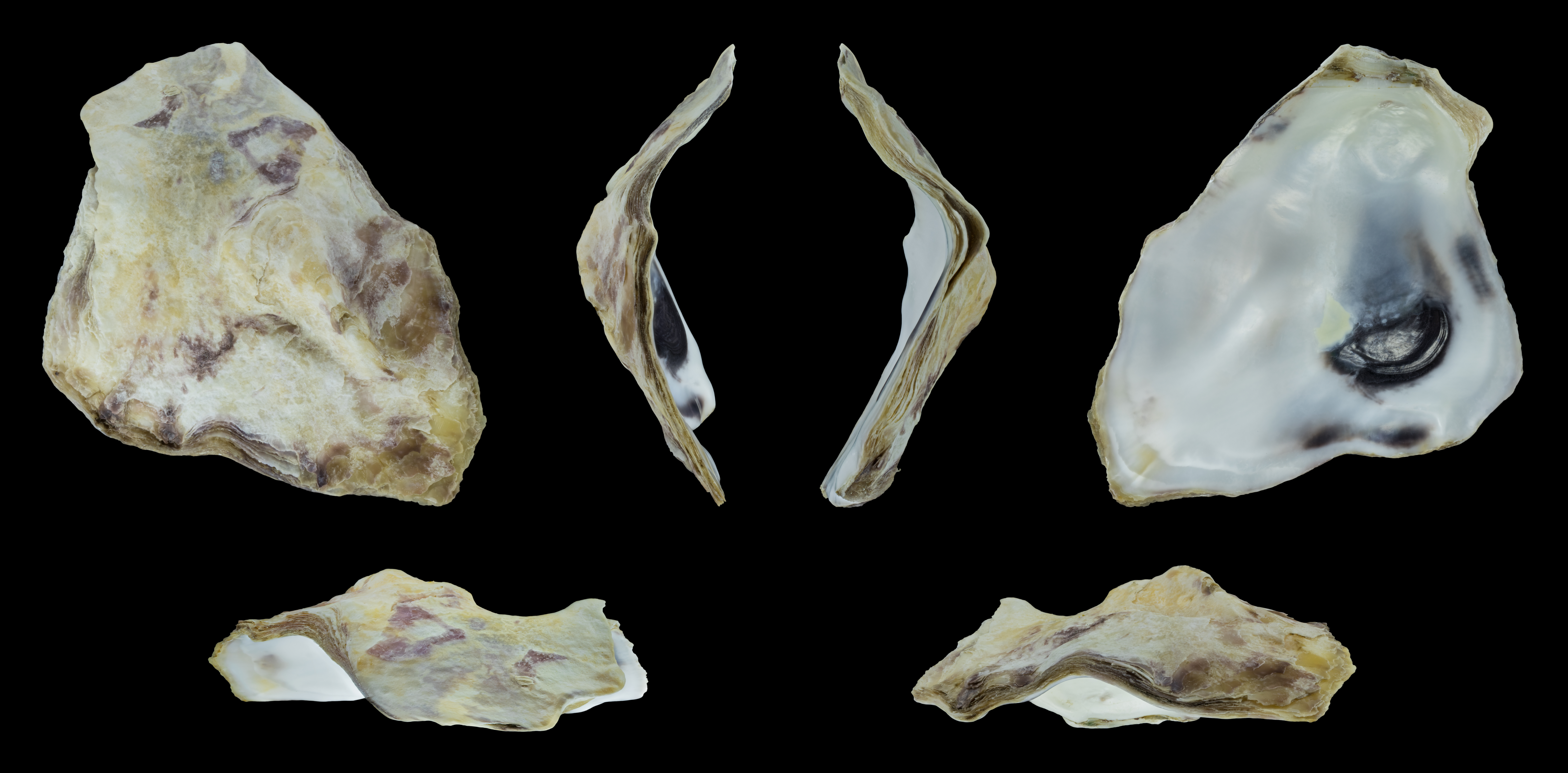
Right valve

Left valve

== Distribution and habitat ==
A 2019 study focused on four populations identified four genetic clusters: one in Noumea, two in NT, and one in Queensland. This species also occurs off Ambon Island, Indonesia.

== Aquaculture in Australia ==
Due to its large size, fast rate of growth and an already established potential market, the black-lip rock oyster is well-suited to the creation of an aquaculture industry in tropical Australia and the Indo-Pacific region. It has also been shown to withstand harsh weather better than other species, and it produces a greater quantity of meat. Much research has been done on breeding the oyster in hatcheries and on-site, in particular at locations in Western Australia (WA), the Northern Territory (NT) and Queensland.

In Bowen, Queensland, the only current Australian commercial farm of black-lip rock oysters has been operating for quite a few years now. This farm has been solely operating using wild spat collection techniques and mainly selling locally due to the high demand for the product. This, however, may soon change as researchers in the DAF Queensland's new Bribie Island Research Centre Oyster Hatchery have just produced over 500,000 spat, proving the possibility of hatchery stock for future commercial production.

The Cooperative Research Centre for Developing Northern Australia (CRCNA) is also running a three-year project worth A$4,124,090, set to finish on 30 September 2023 to conduct research on issues affecting the tropical rock oyster industry across WA and NT, hoping to develop a new aquaculture industry for the region which will create jobs for 500+ people. Project participants include the Yagbani Aboriginal Corporation and the Anindilyakwa Land Council in the NT, and the Murujuga Aboriginal Corporation in WA. The activity is seen as both culturally appropriate and sustainable, and an opportunity to run economic development projects under Aboriginal custodianship. Hatcheries have been developed at Darwin and work is being done at James Cook University in Queensland. Oyster farms on South Goulburn Island, the Pilbara coast (Dampier Peninsula) have been producing oysters for Darwin restaurants, and Bowen (Qld) already has infrastructure to air-freight fish to Asia, which could be used for the export of oysters.

In May 2020 a major milestone was achieved in WA, when stock collected at Cone Bay in the Kimberley was used for breeding at the marine shellfish hatchery in the suburb of Hillarys in Perth. The spat was grown in the hatchery and relocated to one of the trial sites on the coast off Karratha and Derby, at specially selected sites at Cossack and West Lewis Island. This was the first time that the oysters had been commercially grown in WA.
