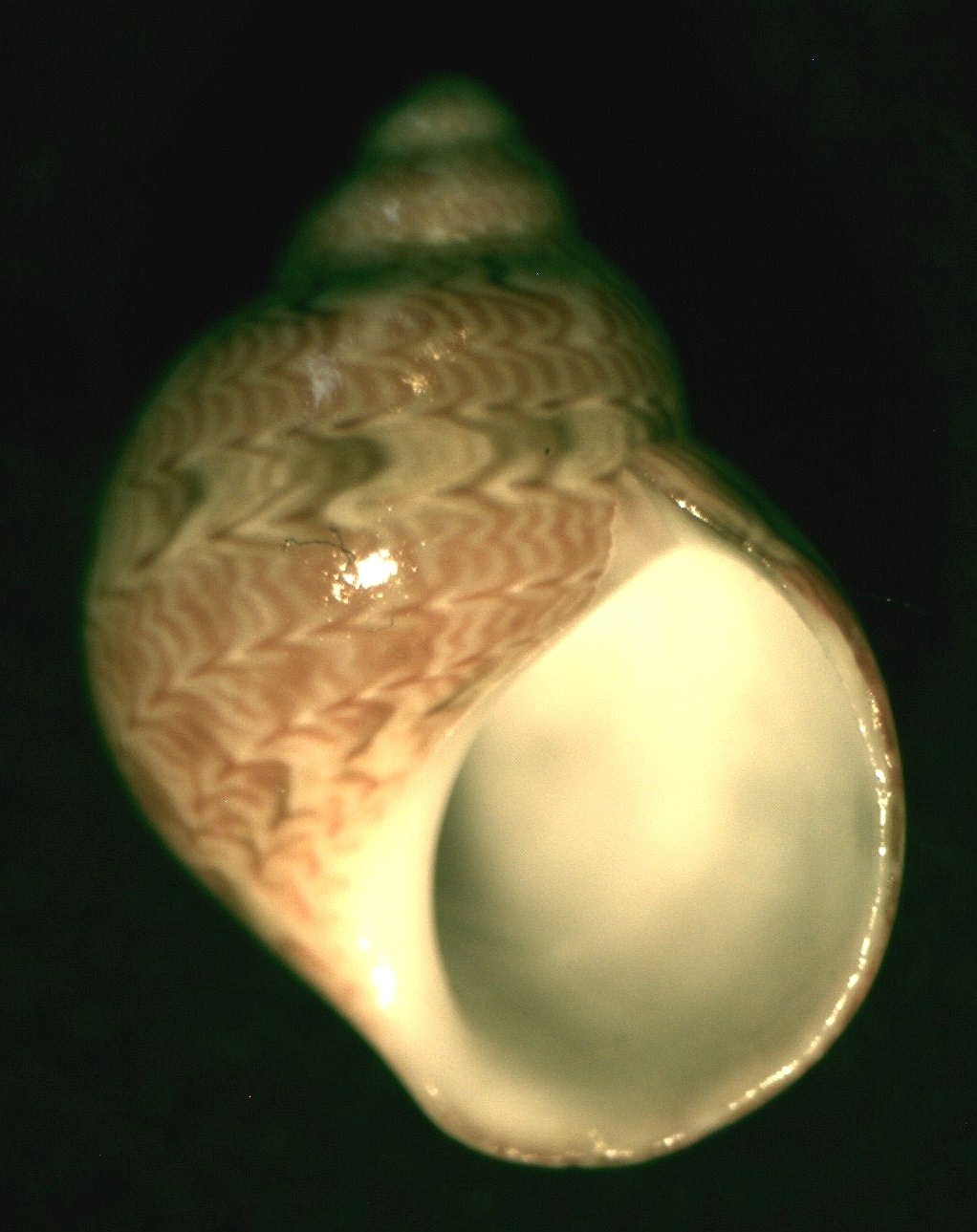
- Tricolia gabiniana

Scientific classification
- Kingdom: Animalia
- Phylum: Mollusca
- Class: Gastropoda
- Subclass: Vetigastropoda
- Order: Trochida
- Family: Phasianellidae
- Subfamily: Tricoliinae
- Genus: Tricolia; Risso, 1826

Type species
- Turbo pullus Linnaeus, 1758

Synonyms
- Chromotis H. Adams & A. Adams, 1863 (junior synonym); Epheriella Pallary, 1820; Eudora Leach, 1852; Eutropia (Tricolia) Risso, 1826; Phasianella (Steganomphalus) G. F. Harris & Burrows, 1891 d; Phasianella (Tricolia) Risso, 1826 (unaccepted combination); † Tricolia (Aizyella) Cossmann, 1889 alternate representation; Tricolia (Eutricolia) F. Nordsieck, 1973; † Tricolia (Phasianochilus) Cossmann, 1918 alternate representation; Tricolia (Steganomphalus) G. F. Harris & Burrows, 1891; Tricolia (Tricolietta) F. Nordsieck, 1973; Tricoliella Monterosato, 1884

= Tricolia =

Genus of gastropods

Tricolia is a genus of sea snails, marine gastropod molluscs in the subfamily Tricoliinae of the family Phasianellidae.

This genus formerly belonged to the family Tricoliidae.

== Description ==
This genus consists of small species with a head without frontal lobes. The shell is ovate, elongated, and imperforate. The radula has a broad, simple median tooth, overlying the bases of the inner laterals. These are subrhomboidal, produced at their outer angles into wings which overlie the bases of the adjacent tooth outward, and have denticulate cusps. The outer lateral is narrow, not produced on the outer angle. The marginal teeth have long simple cusps, The columella is smooth, arcuate, and not dentate.

== Distribution ==
The species occurs in all tropical and subtropical seas.

== Species ==
Species within the genus Tricolia include:

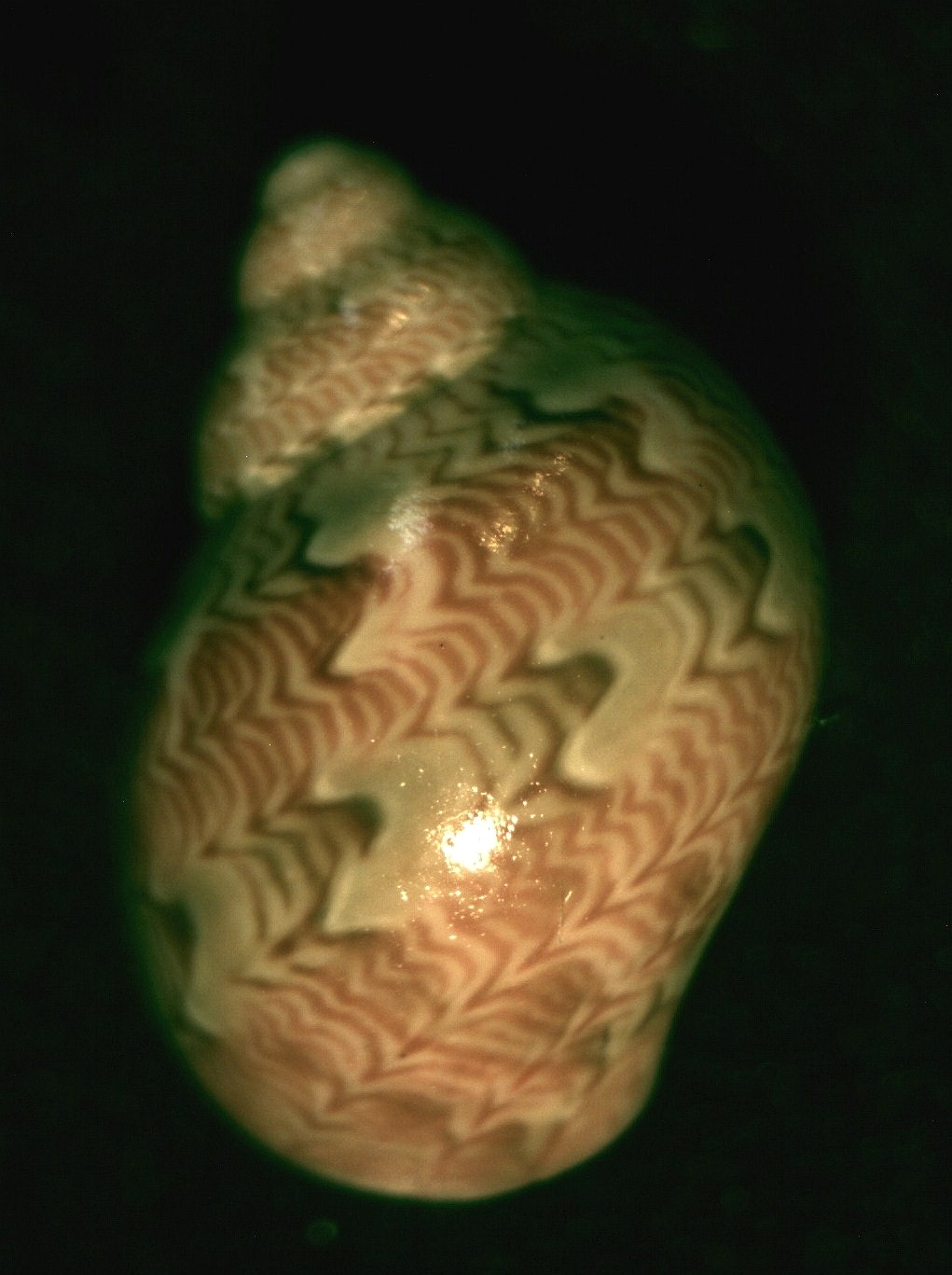
Shell of Tricolia gabiniana

- Tricolia adusta Nangammbi & Herbert, 2006
- Tricolia algoidea (Pallary, 1920)
- Tricolia bicarinata Dunker, 1846
- Tricolia capensis (Dunker, 1846)
- Tricolia delicata Poppe, Tagaro & Goto, 2018
- Tricolia deschampsi Gofas, 1993
- † Tricolia dissimilis (Deshayes, 1863)
- † Tricolia dunkeri (Deshayes, 1863)
- Tricolia elongata (Krauss, 1848)
- Tricolia entomocheila Gofas, 1993
- Tricolia fordiana (Pilsbry, 1888)
- Tricolia formosa (W. H. Turton, 1932)
- Tricolia gabiniana (Cotton & Godfrey, 1938)
- † Tricolia herouvalensis (Cossmann, 1888)
- Tricolia indica Winckworth, 1940
- Tricolia insignis (Turton, 1932)
- Tricolia ios Robertson, 1985
- Tricolia kochii (Philippi, 1848)
- † Tricolia laevis (Defrance, 1826)
- † Tricolia lamarckiana (Deshayes, 1863)
- Tricolia landinii Bogi & Campani, 2007
- † Tricolia laubrierei (Cossmann, 1888)
- Tricolia milaschewitchi Anistratenko & Starobogatov, 1991
- Tricolia miniata (Monterosato, 1884)
- Tricolia munieri (Vélain, 1877)
- Tricolia neritina (Dunker, 1846)
- Tricolia nordsiecki (Talavera, 1978)
- Tricolia petiti (Craven, 1882)
- Tricolia pullus (Linnaeus, 1758)
- Tricolia punctura Gofas, 1993
- Tricolia retrolineata Nangammbi & Herbert, 2008
- Tricolia rosea (Angas, 1867)
- Tricolia saxatilis Nangammbi & Herbert, 2006
- † Tricolia semistriata (Lamarck, 1804)
- Tricolia speciosa (Mühlfeld, 1824)
- Tricolia striolata (W. H. Turton, 1932)
- † Tricolia succinaeopsis (Cossmann, 1888)
- † Tricolia suessoniensis (Deshayes, 1863)
- Tricolia tenuis (Michaud, 1829)
- † Tricolia tenuistriata (Deshayes, 1863)
- Tricolia tingitana Gofas, 1982
- Tricolia tomlini (Gatliff & Gabriel, 1921)
- Tricolia tristis (Pilsbry 1903)
- † Tricolia turbinoides (Lamarck, 1804) †
- † Tricolia vasseuri (Cossmann, 1902)

Species brought into synonymy

- Tricolia adamsi (Philippi, 1853): synonym of Eulithidium adamsi (Philippi, 1853)
- Tricolia affinis (C. B. Adams, 1850): synonym of Eulithidium affine (C. B. Adams, 1850)
- Tricolia affinis beaui Robertson, 1958: synonym of Eulithidium beaui (Robertson, 1958)
- Tricolia alfredensis (Turton, 1932): synonym of Tricolia elongata (Krauss, 1848)
- Tricolia beaui Robertson, 1958: synonym of Eulithidium beaui (Robertson, 1958)
- Tricolia bella (M. Smith, 1937): synonym of Eulithidium bellum (M. Smith, 1937)
- Tricolia bellum M. Smith, 1937: synonym of Eulithidium bellum (M. Smith, 1937)
- Tricolia breve d'Orbigny, 1842: synonym of Eulithidium breve (d'Orbigny, 1842) [nomen dubium]
- Tricolia brongniartii Audouin, 1826: synonym of Phasianella solida (Born, 1778)
- Tricolia bryani Pilsbry, H.A., 1917: synonym of Tricolia variabilis (Pease, 1861)
- Tricolia compta (Gould, 1855): synonym of Eulithidium comptum (Gould, 1855)
- Tricolia cruenta Robertson, 1958: synonym of Eulithidium affine (C. B. Adams, 1850)
- Tricolia cyclostoma (Carpenter, 1864): synonym of Eulithidium cyclostoma (Carpenter, 1864)
- Tricolia diantha McLean, 1970: synonym of Eulithidium diantha (McLean, 1970)
- Tricolia draparnaudi Audouin, 1826: synonym of Echinolittorina punctata (Gmelin, 1791)
- Tricolia guerini Audouin, 1826: synonym of Phasianella solida (Born, 1778)
- Tricolia kraussi E.A. Smith, 1911:synonym of Tricolia bicarinata (Dunker, 1846)
- Tricolia macleani Marincovich, 1973: synonym of Eulithidium macleani (Marincovich, 1973)
- Tricolia megastoma Pilsbry, H.A., 1895: synonym of Tricolia variabilis (Pease, 1861)
- Tricolia molokaiensis Pilsbry, H.A., 1917: synonym of Tricolia variabilis (Pease, 1861)
- Tricolia nicaeensis Risso 1826: synonym of Tricolia speciosa (Mühlfeld, 1824)
- Tricolia oligomphala (Pilsbry, 1895): synonym of Tricolia variabilis (Pease, 1861)
- Tricolia perforata (Philippi, 1848): synonym of Eulithidium perforatum (Philippi, 1848)
- Tricolia phasianella (Philippi, 1849): synonym of Eulithidium phasianella (Philippi, 1849)
- Tricolia picta (da Costa, 1778): synonym of Tricolia pullus picta (da Costa, 1778)
- Tricolia pterocladia sic: synonym of Eulithidium pterocladicum (Robertson, 1958)
- Tricolia pterocladica Robertson, 1958: synonym of Eulithidium pterocladicum (Robertson, 1958)
- Tricolia pulchella (Récluz, 1843): synonym of Eulithidium bellum (M. Smith, 1937)
- Tricolia pulloides (Carpenter, 1865): synonym of Eulithidium pulloides (Carpenter, 1865)
- Tricolia rentneri Nordsieck 1973: synonym of Tricolia speciosa (Mühlfeld, 1824)
- Tricolia rissoi Audouin, 1826: synonym of Melarhaphe neritoides (Linnaeus, 1758)
- Tricolia rubra Risso 1826: synonym of Tricolia speciosa (Mühlfeld, 1824)
- Tricolia speciosa var. seriopunctata Monterosato 1884: synonym of Tricolia speciosa (Mühlfeld, 1824)
- Tricolia speciosa var. virescens Monterosato 1884: synonym of Tricolia speciosa (Mühlfeld, 1824)
- Tricolia substriata (Carpenter, 1864): synonym of Eulithidium substriatum (P. P. Carpenter, 1864)
- Tricolia tessellata (Potiez & Michaud, 1838): synonym of Eulithidium tessellatum (Potiez & Michaud, 1838)
- Tricolia tessellata auct. non Potiez & Michaud, 1838: synonym of Eulithidium pterocladicum (Robertson, 1958)
- Tricolia tesselata auct. non C. B. Adams, 1850: synonym of Eulithidium thalassicola (Robertson, 1958)
- Tricolia thalassicola Robertson, 1958: synonym of Eulithidium thalassicola (Robertson, 1958)
- Tricolia thaanumi Pilsbry, H.A., 1917: synonym of Tricolia variabilis (Pease, 1861)
- Tricolia tricolor (Monterosato in Bucquoy, Dautzenberg & Dollfus, 1884): synonym of Tricolia pullus (Linnaeus, 1758)
- Tricolia tropidophora Tomlin, 1931: synonym of Tricolia bicarinata (Dunker, 1846)
- Tricolia umbilicata (d'Orbigny, 1840): synonym of Eulithidium umbilicatum (d'Orbigny, 1840)
- Tricolia variabilis (Pease, 1860): synonym of Hiloa variabilis (Pease, 1861)
- Tricolia variegata (Carpenter, 1864): synonym of Eulithidium variegatum (Carpenter, 1864)
- Tricolia virgo Angas, G.F., 1867: synonym of Tricolia variabilis (Pease, 1861)
