= List of marine molluscs of Mozambique =

The list of marine molluscs of Mozambique is a list of saltwater species that form a part of the molluscan fauna of Mozambique. This list does not include the land or freshwater molluscs.

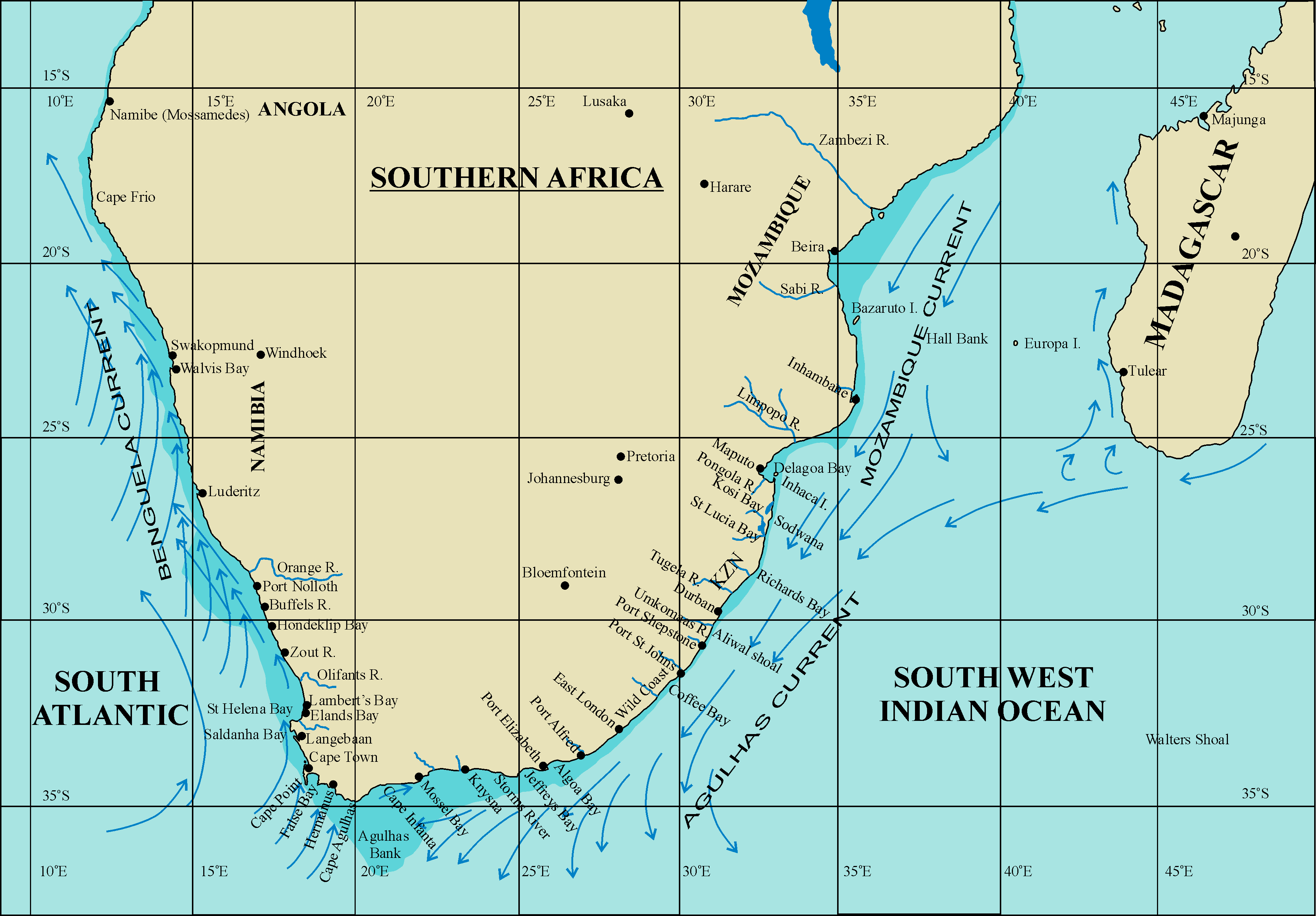
Map of the Southern African coastline showing some of the landmarks referred to in species range statements

== Gastropoda ==
Gastropods in Mozambique include:

=== Patellogastropoda ===
Patellidae - True limpets

- Cellana radiata capensis (Gmelin, 1791)(Port Alfred to Kenya) (syn. Cellana capensis Gmelin, Helcioniscus capensis (Gmelin, 1790), Patella capensis Gmelin, 1791)
- Variable limpet Helcion concolor Krauss, 1848 (Eastern Cape to Mozambique)
- Patella flexuosa (Quoy & Gaimard, 1834) (Northern KwaZulu-Natal to Mzambique) (syn. Scutellastra flexuosa)
- Patella pica Reeve, 1854 (Zululand to Mozambique) (syn. Scutellastra pica)

=== Vetigastropoda ===
Pleurotomariidae

- Bayerotrochus africanus (Tomlin, 1948) (Central KawZulu-Natal to Mozambique)

Haliotidae - Abalone

- Haliotis clathrata Reeve, 1846 (Mozambique)
- Haliotis ovina Gmelin 1791 (Northern KwaZulu-Natal to Mozambique)
- Haliotis pustulata Reeve, 1846 (Northern KwaZulu-Natal to Mozambique)

Fissurellidae - Keyhole limpets

- Amblychilepas dubia (Reeve, 1849) (KwaZulu-Natal south coast to southern Mozambique)
- Diodora calyculata (Krauss, 1848) (Port Alfred to southern Mozambique)
- Diodora crucifera (Pilsbry, 1890) (Port Alfred to northern Indian Ocean)
- Diodora natalensis (Krauss, 1848) (Port Alfred to Mozambique) (syn. Fissurella natalensis Krauss, 1848)
- Emarginula sibogae (Schepman, 1908) (KwaZulu-Natal to Mozambique) but genus given in this reference as Emarginella. Corrected using http://www.marinespecies.org/
- Macroschisma africana Tomlin, 1932 (Western Transkei to Mozambique)
- Scutus unguis (Linne, 1758) (East London to KwaZulu-Natal and tropical Indo-Pacific)

Trochidae

- Clanculus puniceus (Philippi, 1846) (KwaZulu-Natal south coast to tropical Indo-Pacific)

Turbinidae - Turban shells

- Bolma bathyraphis (E.A. Smith, 1899) (KwaZulu-Natal and Mozambique)
- Turbo argyrostomus Linnaeus, 1758 (KwaZulu-Natal and Mozambique)
- Turbo chrysostomus Linnaeus, 1758 (northern KwaZulu-Natal and Mozambique)
- Crowned turban shell Lunella coronata (Gmelin, 1791) (Central KwaZulu-Natal to Mozambique)(syn. Turbo coronatus Gmelin, 1790)

Phasianellidae

- Pheasant shell Tricolia capensis (Dunker, 1846) (Namibia to Mozambique)(syn. Phasianella capensis Dunker, 1846)
- Tricolia neritina (Dunker, 1846) (Namibia to Mozambique)(syn. Phasianella neritina Dunker, 1846)
- Tricolia retrolineata Nangammbi & Herbert, 2008 - southern Mozambique

=== Neritimorpha ===
Neritidae - Nerites

- Blotched nerite Nerita albicilla Linnaeus, 1758 (Eastern cape to Mozambique)
- Nerita plicata Linnaeus, 1758 (Western Transkei to tropics)
- Nerita polita Linnaeus, 1758 (East London to tropical Indo-Pacific)
- Textile nerite Nerita textilis Gmelin, 1791 (Transkei to Mozambique)

=== Caenogastropoda ===
Hipponicidae - Hoof limpets

- Horse's hoof Hipponix conicus (Schumacher, 1817) (Cape Point to Mozambique)

Littorinidae

- Striped periwinkle Littoraria glabrata (Philippi, 1846) (Transkei to Mozambique) (Syn. Littorina kraussi Rosewater, 1970, Littorina glabrata Philippi, 1846)
- Estuarine periwinkles Littoraria scabra group. (Eastern Cape to Mozambique)
- Nodular periwinkle Nodilittorina natalensis Philippi, 1847 (Eastern Cape to Mozambique)

Assimineidae

- Assiminea ovata Krauss, 1848 (Knysna to Mozambique)

Vermetidae - Worm shells

- Colonial worm shell Dendropoma corallinaceum (Tomlin, 1939) (Orange river to Transkei) (syn. Vermetus (Stoa) corallinaceus Tomlin, 1939)

Turritellidae

- Turritella carinifera Lamarck, 1799 (Western Cape to southern Mozambique)
- Turritella chrysostomus Linnaeus, 1758 (northern KwaZulu-Natal and Mozambique)

Potamididae

- Truncated mangrove snail Cerithidea decollata Linnaeus, 1758 (Eastern Cape to Mozambique)
- Mangrove whelk Terebralia palustris Bruguière (Central KwaZulu-Natal to Mozambique)

Cerithiidae

- Knobbed horn shell Rhinoclavis sinensis Gmelin, 1791 (Transkei to Mozambique)
- Cerithium citrinum Sowerby, 1855 (Durban to Mozambique)
- Cerithium crassilabrum (East London to Mozambique)
- Cerithium echinatum Lamarck, 1822 (northern KwaZulu-Natal and Mozambique)
- Rhinoclavis articulata (Adams & Reeve, 1850) (KwaZulu-Natal and Mozambique)
- Rhinoclavis diadema Houbrick, 1978 (KwaZulu-Natal and Mozambique)

Xenophoridae

- Stellaria gigantea (Schepman, 1909) (Central KwaZulu-Natal to Mozambique)
- Stellaria solaris (Linnaeus, 1764) (KwaZulu-Natal and Mozambique)
- Xenophora corrugata (Reeve, 1842) (Northern KwaZulu-Natal and Mozambique)
- Xenophora pallidula (Reeve, 1842) (KwaZulu-Natal and Mozambique)
- Xenophora tulearensis Stewart & Kosuge, 1993 (Central KwaZulu-Natal and Mozambique)

Cypraeidae - True cowries

- Ring cowrie Cypraea annulus Linnaeus, 1758 (Algoa Bay to Mozambique)
- Arabic cowrie Cypraea arabica Linnaeus, 1758 (Algoa Bay to Mozambique)
- Cypraea barclayi Reeve, 1857 (Cape St Blaize and north/east) (syn. Erronea barclayi (Cape St Blaize to Mozambique))
- Cypraea broderipii Sowerby II, 1832 (Port Edward and north) (syn. Lyncina broderipii (KwaZulu-Natal and Mozambique))
- Snake's head cowrie Cypraea caputserpentis Linnaeus, 1758 (Still Bay to Mozambique)
- Carnelian cowrie Cypraea carneola Linnaeus, 1758 (Jeffreys Bay to Mozambique)
- Orange cowrie Cypraea citrina Gray, 1825 (Jeffreys Bay to Mozambique)
- Cypraea cribraria Linnaeus, 1758 (Jeffreys Bay and Mozambique) (syn. Cribraria cribraria comma)
- Eroded cowrie Cypraea erosa Linnaeus, 1758 (Knysna estuary to Mozambique)
- Kitten cowrie Cypraea felina Gmelin, 1791 (Port Alfred to Mozambique)
- Cypraea fultoni Sowerby III, 1903 (Haga Haga and north) (Sub-species Barycypraea fultoni amorimi and Barycypraea fultoni massiera(both Mozambique))
- Honey cowrie Cypraea helvola Linnaeus, 1758 (Jeffreys Bay to Mozambique)
- Cypraea isabella Linnaeus, 1758 (Coffee Bay and north) (syn. Luria isabella (Wild Coast to Mozambique))
- Cypraea mappa Linnaeus, 1758 (Park Rynie) (syn. Leporicypraea mappa (KwaZulu-Natal and Mozambique))
- Cypraea marginalis Dillwyn, 1827 (Jeffreys Bay and north) (syn. Erosaria marginalis (KwaZulu-Natal and Mozambique))
- Money cowrie Cypraea moneta Linnaeus, 1758 (Transkei to Mozambique) (Durban and north)
- Cypraea nucleus Linnaeus, 1758 (Scottburgh and north) (syn. Staphylaea nucleus (KwaZulu-Natal and Mozambique))
- Cypraea owenii Sowerby II, 1837 (Coffee Bay and north) (syn. Bistolida owenii vasta (Wild Coast to Mozambique))
- Cypraea scurra Gmelin, 1791 (Scottburgh and north) (syn. Mauritia scurra (KwaZulu-Natal and Mozambique))
- Stippled cowrie Cypraea staphylaea Linnaeus, 1758 (Mngazana to Mozambique)
- Cypraea stolida Linnaeus, 1758 (Scottburgh and north) (syn. Bistolida stolida diauges (KwaZulu-Natal and Mozambique))
- Cypraea talpa Linnaeus, 1758 (Park Rynie and north) (syn. Talparia talpa (Northern Wild Coast to Mozambique))
- Tiger cowrie Cypraea tigris Linnaeus, 1758 (Transkei to Mozambique) (Algoa Bay and north)
- Erosia ocellata (Linnaeus, 1758) (KwaZulu-Natal and Mozambique))
- Erronea chinensis (Gmelin, 1791) (Jeffreys Bay to Mozambique))
- Erronea succinata (Lamarck, 1810) (Northern KwaZulu-Natal and Mozambique))

Ovulidae

- Calpurnus verrucosus (Linnaeus, 1758) (Sodwana Bay and Mozambique)
- Ovula costellata Lamarck, 1810 (Sodwana Bay and Mozambique)
- Ovula ovum (Linnaeus, 1758) (Sodwana Bay and Mozambiqueh)
- Phenacovolva longirostrata (Sowerby I, 1828) (Whale Rock (Transkei) to Mozambique)
- ?Phenacovolva poppei Fehse, 2000 (KwaZulu-Natal to Mozambique)
- Phenacovolva rugosa (Cate and Azuma, 1973) (Park Rynie and Mozambique)
- Volva volva Linnaeus, 1758 (Pumila (southern KwaZulu-Natal) to Mozambique)

Velutinidae

- Coriocella nigra Blainville, 1824 (Wild Coast to Mozambique)

Triviidae - Trivia

- Tear drops or Riceys Trivia pellucidula Gaskoin, 1846 (Jeffreys Bay to Mozambique)

Naticidae - Necklace shells

- Eunaticina perobliqua (Dautzenberg & Fischer, 1906) (KwaZulu-Natal and Mozambique)
- Mammilla fibrosa (Eydoux & Souleyet, 1852) (Mozambique)
- Natica arachnoidea (Gmelin, 1791) (Mozambique)
- Natica lineata (Roding, 1798) (KwaZulu-Natal and Mozambique)
- Naticarius alapapilionis (Roding, 1798) (northern Wild Coast to Mozambique)
- Naticarius manceli (Josseaume, 1874) (northern KwaZulu-Natal to Mozambique)
- Naticarius onca (Roding, 1798) (northern KwaZulu-Natal to Mozambique)
- Neverita albumen (Linnaeus, 1758) (Durban to Mozambique)
- Neverita perselephanti (Link, 1807) (KwaZulu-Natal to Mozambique)
- Comma necklace shell Notocochlis gualteriana Récluz, 1844. (Syn. Natica gualteriana) (Eastern Cape to Mozambique)
- Moon shell Polinices didyma Röding, 1798 (Mossel Bay to Mozambique)
- Polinices mammilla Linnaeus 1758 (Transkei to Mozambique)
- Polinices paciae Bozzetti, 1997 (Northern KwaZulu-Natal and Mozambique)
- Polinices priamus (Recluz, 1844) (Mozambique)
- Polinices sebae (Recluz, 1844) (KwaZulu-Natal to Mozambique)
- Polinices simiae (Deshayes, 1838) (Wild Coast to Mozambique)
- Polinices syrphetodes (Kilburn, 1976) (KwaZulu-Natal to Mozambique)
- Sinum delessertii (Recluz, 1843) (KwaZulu-Natal and Mozambique)
- Sinum haliotoideum (Linnaeus, 1758) (KwaZulu-Natal and Mozambique)
- Sinum laevigatum (Lamarck, 1822) (Durban to Mozambique)
- Sinum quasimodoides Kilburn, 1976 (Northern KwaZulu-Natal to Mozambique)
- Tanea euzona (Recluz, 1844) (KwaZulu-Natal and Mozambique)
- Tanea hilaris (Sowerby, 1914) (KwaZulu-Natal and Mozambique)
- Tectonatica violacea (Sowerby, 1825) (Northern KwaZulu-Natal and Mozambique)

Tonnidae - Cassinae - Helmet shells

- Casmaria erinaceus (Linnaeus, 1758) (KwaZulu-Natal and Mozambique)
- Casmaria ponderosa (Gmelin, 1791) (Northern KwaZulu-Natal and Mozambique)
- Cassis cornuta (Linnaeus, 1758) (Northern KwaZulu-Natal and Mozambique)
- Galeodea keyteri (Kilburn, 1975) (Northern KwaZulu-Natal and Mozambique)
- Oocorys sulcata Fischer, 1883 (eastern seaboard of South Africa and Mozambique)
- Checkerboard bonnet shell Phalium areola (Linnaeus, 1758) (KwaZulu-Natal and Mozambique)
- Phalium fimbria (Gmelin, 1791) (Northern KwaZulu-Natal and Mozambique)
- Phalium glaucum (Linnaeus, 1758) (KwaZulu-Natal and Mozambique)
- Semicassis bisulcata (Schubert & Wagner, 1829) (KwaZulu-Natal and Mozambique)
- Semicassis bulla fernandesi (Kilburn, 1975) (Central KwaZulu-Natal and Mozambique)
- Semicassis craticulata (Euthyme, 1885) (Jeffreys Bay to Mozambique)
- Semicassis faurotis (Jousseaume, 1888) (Kwazulu-Natal and Mozambique)
- Semicassis microstoma (von Martens, 1903) (Central Kwazulu-Natal to Mozambique)

Janthinidae - Violet shells

- Bubble raft shell or Violet snail Janthina janthina Linnaeus, 1758 (Cape Columbine to Mozambique)

Bursidae

- Granular frog shell Bursa granularis Röding, 1798 (Transkei to Mozambique)

Ranellidae

- Pink lady Charonia lampas pustulata Euthyme, 1889 (Cape Point to Mozambique)
- Furry ridged triton Cabestana cutacea africana Adams A. 1855 (Namibia to southern Mozambique)

Muricidae

- Branched murex Chicoreus inflatus Lamarck, 1822. (Syn. Chicoreus ramosus) (Central KwaZulu-Natal to Mozambique)
- Mulberry shell Morula granulata Duclos, 1832 (Eastern Cape to Mozambique)
- Short-spined murex Murex brevispina Lamarck, 1822 (Central KwaZulu-Natal to Mozambique)
- Salmon lipped whelk Purpura persica Linnaeus, 1758 (Syn. Purpura panama) (Transkei to Mozambique)
- Thais bufo Lamarck 1822 (Transkei to Indo-Pacific)
- Thais (Mancinella) alouina Röding, 1798. (Syn. Mancinella alouina) (Transkei to Indo-Pacific)
- Thais savignyi Deshayes, 1844 (Zululand to Indo-Pacific)

Mitridae - Mitres

- Mitra litterata Lamarck, 1811 (West Transkei to Mozambique)

Strombidae - Strombs

- Lambis chiragra arthritica Roding, 1798 (Northern KwaZulu-Natal to Mozambique)
- Lambis crocata crocata (Link, 1807) (Northern KwaZulu-Natal to Mozambique)
- Lambis digitata (Perry, 1811) (Northern KwaZulu-Natal to Mozambique)
- Lambis lambis (Linnaeus, 1758) (Northern KwaZulu-Natal and Mozambique)
- Lambis scorpius indomaris Abbott, 1961 (Mozambique)
- Lambis truncata truncata (Lightfoot, 1768) (Northern KwaZulu-Natal to Mozambique)
- Variable stromb Strombus mutabilis Swainson, 1821 (Eastern Cape to Mozambique)
- Strombus wilsonorum Abbott, 1967 (KwaZulu-Natal and Mozambique)

Nassariidae

Dogwhelks

- Shielded dogwhelk Nassarius arcularius plicatus (Röding, P.F., 1798) (Central KwaZulu-Natal to Mozambique)
- Tick shell Nassarius kraussianus (Dunker, R.W., 1846) (Namaqualand to Mozambique)

Plough shells

- Annulated plough shell Bullia annulata Lamarck, 1816 (Cape Columbine to Mozambique)
- Bullia mozambicensis E. A. Smith, 1878 (KwaZulu-Natal south coast to Mozambique)
- Pleated plough shell Bullia natalensis Krauss, C.F., 1848 (Transkei to Mozambique)

Olividae - Olive shells

- Carolinian olive shell Oliva caroliniana Duclos, 1835 (Transkei to Mozambique)

Conidae - Cone shells

- Hebrew cone Conus ebraeus Linnaeus, 1758 (Transkei to Mozambique)
- Livid cone Conus lividus Hwass in Bruguière, 1792 (Transkei to Mozambique)
- Sponsal cone Conus sponsalis Hwass in Bruguière, 1792 (Transkei to Mozambique)
- Textile cone Conus textile Linnaeus, 1758 (Natal northwards)

=== Heterobranchia ===
Architectonicidae

- Variegated sundial shell Heliacus variegatus (Gmelin, 1791) (Eastern Cape to Mozambique)

Siphonariidae - False limpets

- Siphonaria nigerrima Smith, 1903 (Zululand to Mozambique)
- Siphonaria tenuicostulata Smith, 1903 (Durban to Mozambique)

Hydatinidae

- Polka-dot bubble shell Micromelo undata (Brughiere, 1792) (Transkei to Mozambique)
- Striped bubble shell Hydatina physis (Linnaeus, 1758) (Eastern Cape to Mozambique)

Philinidae

- Sand slug Philine aperta (Linnaeus, 1767) (Cape Columbine to Mozambique)

==== Anaspidea ====
Aplysiidae

- Shaggy sea hare Bursatella leachii leachii (Blainville. 1817) (Cape Columbine to Mozambique)
- Shaggy sea hare Bursatella leachii africana (Engel, 1927)
- Wedge sea hare Dolabella auricularia (Solander, 1786) (Mossel Bay to Mozambique)

==== Notaspidea ====
Pleurobranchidae

- Lemon pleurobranch Berthellina citrina (Ruppell and Leuckart, 1828) (Cape Point to Mozambique)

==== Nudibranchia - Nudibranchs ====
Hexabranchidae

- Spanish dancer Hexabranchus sanguineus (Ruppell and Leuckart, 1828) (KwaZulu-Natal south coast to Mozambique)

== Bivalvia ==
Bivalves in Mozambique include:

Mytilidae - Mussels

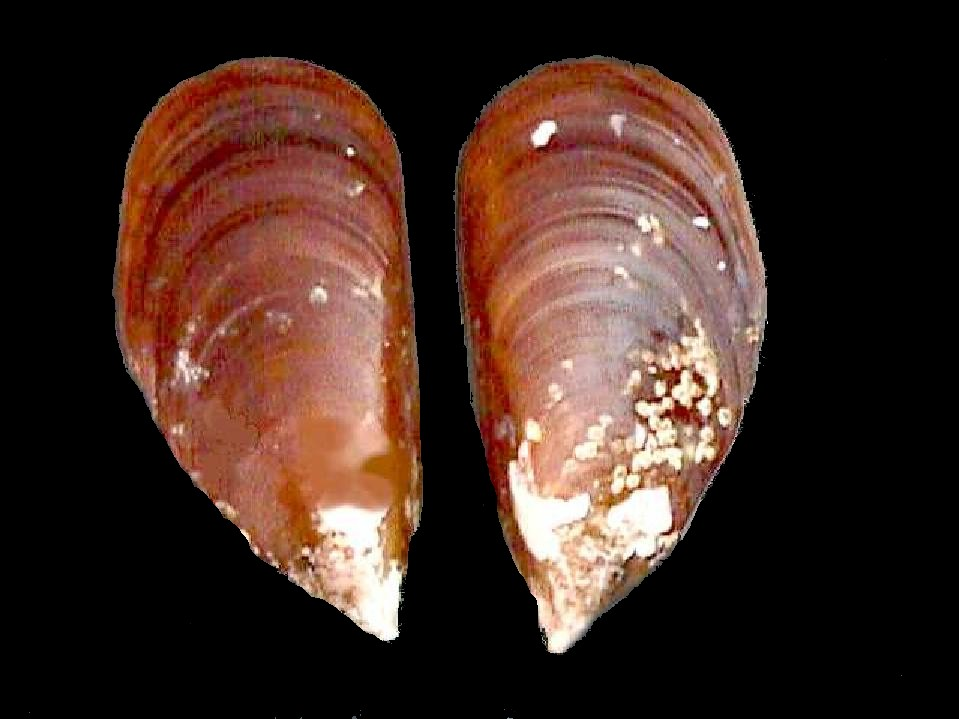
Perna perna

- Estuarine mussel Arcuatula capensis (Cape Agulhas to Mozambique)
- Brack-water mussel Brachidontes virgiliae (Eastern Cape to Mozambique)
- Semistriated mussel Brachidontes semistriatus (Port Elizabeth to Mozambique)
- Ear mussel Modiolus auriculatus (Port Elizabeth to Mozambique)
- Brown mussel Perna perna (Cape Point to Mozambique)
- Ledge mussel Septifer bilocularis (Port Elizabeth to Mozambique)

Arcidae - Ark clams

- Arca avellana Lam? (Port Elizabeth to Mozambique)
- Oblique ark shell Barbatia obliquata (Cape Columbine to Mozambique)

Noetiidae

- Striarca symmetrica (Port Elizabeth to Mozambique)

Pinnidae - Pen shells

- Pinna muricata (Port Elizabeth to Mozambique)

Gryphaeidae

- Hyotissa numisma (Transkei to Mozambique)

Ostreidae - True oysters

- Natal rock oyster Saccostrea cucullata (Port Elizabeth to Mozambique) (syn. Crassostrea cucculata)
- Cape rock oyster Striostrea margaritacea (Cape Point to Mozambique)

Anomiidae - Saddle oysters

- Saddle oyster Anomia achaeus (Port Elizabeth to Mozambique)

Pteriidae - Pearl oysters

- Cape pearl oyster Pinctada capensis (Capr Agulhas to Mozambique)

Pectinidae - Scallops

- Dwarf fan shell Chlamys tincta (Cape Columbine to Mozambique)

Cardiidae - Cockles

- Cockle Trachycardium flavum (Central KwaZulu-Natal to Mozambique)
- Trachycardium rubicundum (Eastern Transkei to Mozambique)

Tridacnidae - Giant clams

- Giant clam Tridacna squamosa (Northern KwaZulu-Natal to Mozambique)

Mactridae - Trough shells

- Smooth trough shell Mactra glabrata (Cape Columbine to Mozambique)

Carditidae

- Rectangular false cockle Cardita variegata (Mossel Bay to Mozambique)

Solenidae

- Solen cylindraceus (Transkei to Mozambique)

Lucinidae

- Smooth platter shell Loripes clausus Philippi 1848 (Mossel Bay to Mozambique)

Unionidae

- Toothless platter shell Anodontia edentula Linnaeus 1758 (Mossel Bay to Mozambique)

Lasaeidae

- Dwarf rusty clam Lasaea adansoni turtoni (Cape Point to Mozambique)Gmelin 1791

Tellinidae

- Littoral tellin Macoma litoralis (Mossel Bay to Mozambique)

Teredinidae

- Shipworm Bankia carinata (Mossel Bay to Mozambique)

Donacidae - Wedge shells

- Donax bipartitus (East London to Mozambique)
- Round ended wedge shell Donax burnupi (Cape Point to Mozambique)
- Slippery wedge shell Donax lubricus (Port Alfred to Mozambique)
- Ridged wedge shell Donax madagscariensis (Transkei to Mozambique)

Psammobiidae - Sunset clams

- Sunset clam Hiatula lunulata (Transkei to Mozambique)

Veneridae - Venus shells

- Dosinia hepatica (Mossel Bay to Mozambique)
- Beaked clam Eumarcia paupercula (Mossel Bay to Mozambique)
- Ribbed venus Gafrarium pectinatum alfredense (Port Elizabeth to Mozambique)
- Meretrix meretrix (only recorded from Mozambique)
- Zigzag clam Pitar abbreviatus (Cape Point to Mozambique)
- Tivela polita (Transkei to Mozambique)
- Warty venus Venus verrucosa(Namibia to Mozambique)

== Polyplacophora ==
Chitons (Polyplacophora) in Mozambique include:

Ischnochitonidae

- Dwarf chiton Ischnochiton oniscus (Cape Columbine to Mozambique)

Chitonidae

- Black chiton Onithochiton literatus (Cape Point to Mozambique)

== Cephalopoda ==
Cephalopods in Mozambique include:

Teuthida - Squid

Loliginidae

- Indian Ocean squid Uroteuthis duvauceli

Sepiida - Cuttlefish

Sepiidae

- Common cuttlefish Sepia vermiculata Quoy and Gaimard, 1832 (Orange river to Mozambique)

Spirulida - Ram's horn squid

Spirulidae

- Ram's horn shell Spirula spirula Linnaeus 1758 (Eastern Cape to Mozambique)

== See also ==
- List of non-marine molluscs of Mozambique

Lists of molluscs of surrounding countries:

- List of marine molluscs of Madagascar
- List of marine molluscs of South Africa
- List of marine molluscs of Tanzania
