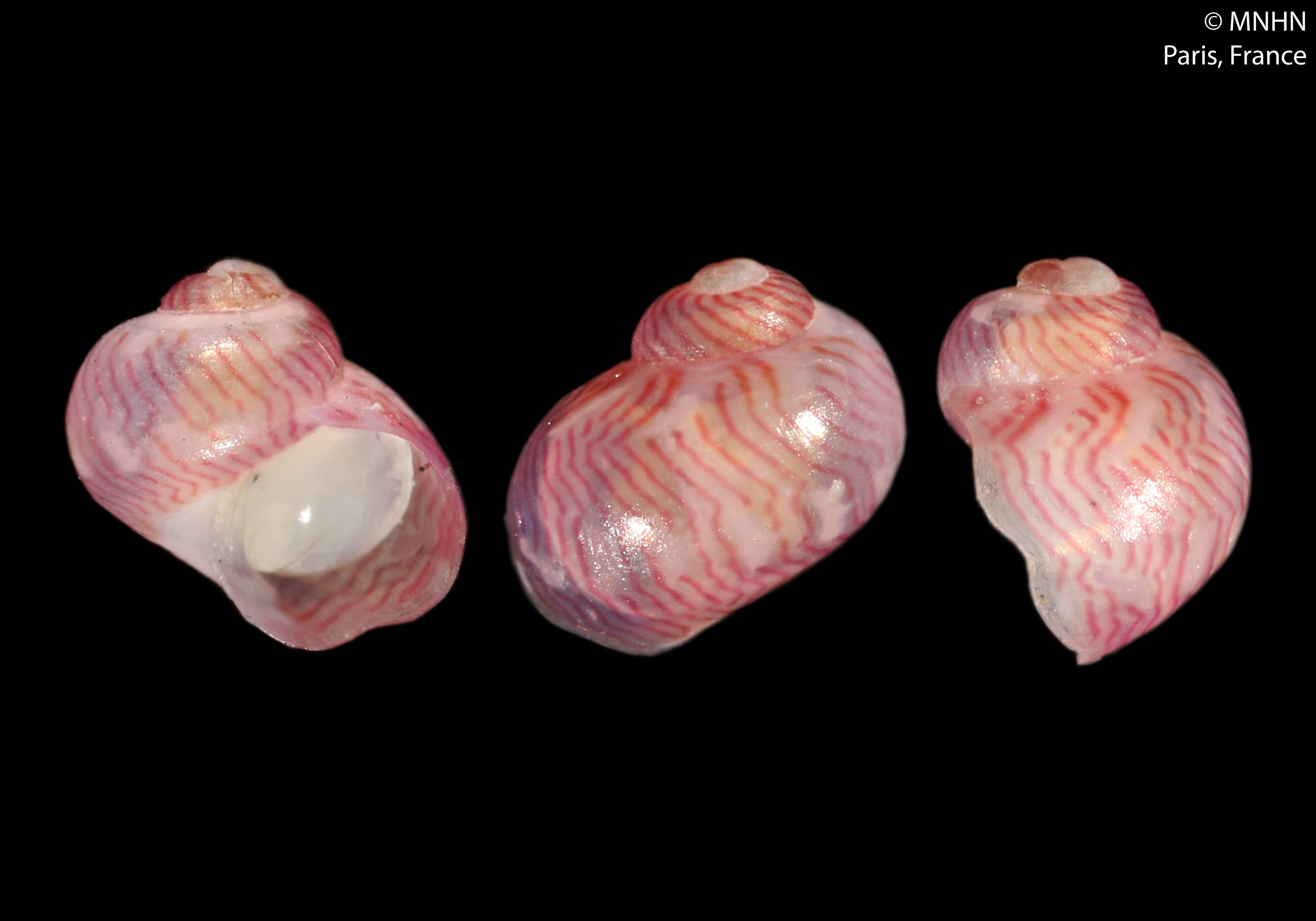
- Shell of Tricolia deschampsi (holotype at MNHN, Paris)

Scientific classification
- Kingdom: Animalia
- Phylum: Mollusca
- Class: Gastropoda
- Subclass: Vetigastropoda
- Order: Trochida
- Family: Phasianellidae
- Genus: Tricolia
- Species: T. deschampsi

Binomial name
- Tricolia deschampsi Gofas, 1993

= Tricolia deschampsi =

Species of gastropod

Tricolia deschampsi is a species of sea snail, a marine gastropod mollusc in the family Phasianellidae. It was first described as a separate species by Gofas in 1993, named after Guy Deschamps.

== Description ==
The height of the shell reaches 1.7 mm. The shell of this species is easily confused with Tricolia tingitana. The shell has a globose shape, with three whorls. The colour of the shell's narrow lines are usually pink, occasionally brown. The shell has 6 to 7 spiral cords on the first teleoconch whorl and three shallow sinuosities on the outer lip of the shell. The snail itself has only two pairs of epipodial tentacles, differentiating from close relatives that have three.

== Ecology ==
=== Habitat ===
Common in algae that grows best in strong light, around 10–40 metres in depth. Shells that are dredged in deep waters are transported.

=== Distribution ===
This marine species occurs at the Strait of Gibraltar and off Italy.
