= Tricolia milaschewitchi =

Scientific classification
- Kingdom: Animalia
- Phylum: Mollusca
- Class: Gastropoda
- Subclass: Vetigastropoda
- Order: Trochida
- Superfamily: Trochoidea
- Family: Phasianellidae
- Subfamily: Tricoliinae
- Genus: Tricolia
- Species: T. milaschewitchi

Binomial name
- Tricolia milaschewitchi Anistratenko & Starobogatov, 1991

Species of gastropod

Tricolia milaschewitchi is a species of small sea snail with calcareous opercula, a marine gastropod mollusk in the family Phasianellidae, the pheasant snails.

== Description ==
The height of the shell reaches 6 mm.

== Distribution ==
This species can be found in the Black Sea.

== Habitat ==
This species is found in the following habitats:

- Brackish
- Marine
