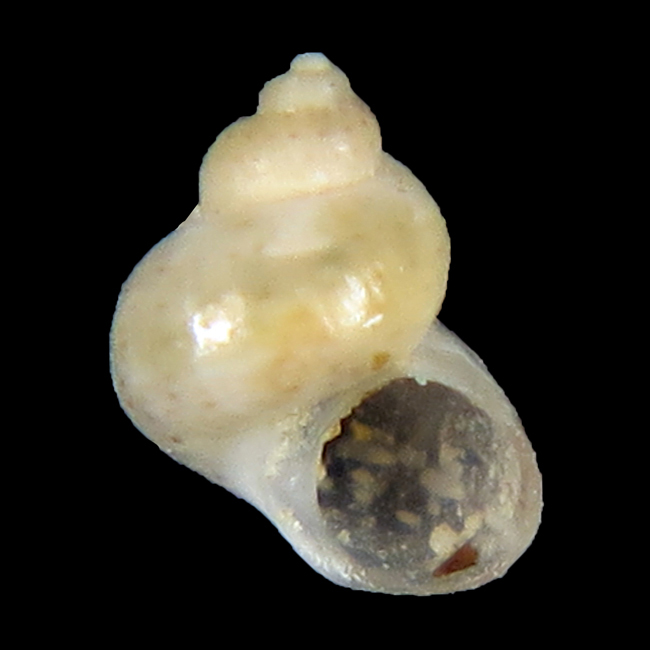

Scientific classification
- Kingdom: Animalia
- Phylum: Mollusca
- Class: Gastropoda
- Subclass: Vetigastropoda
- Order: Trochida
- Family: Phasianellidae
- Genus: Tricolia
- Species: T. delicata

Binomial name
- Tricolia delicata Poppe, Tagaro & Goto, 2018

= Tricolia delicata =

Species of gastropod

Tricolia delicata is a species of sea snail, a marine gastropod mollusc in the family Phasianellidae.

== Description ==
The length of the shell attains 2.1 mm.

== Distribution ==
This marine species occurs off the Philippines.
