= Eulithidium pulloides =

Scientific classification
- Kingdom: Animalia
- Phylum: Mollusca
- Class: Gastropoda
- Subclass: Vetigastropoda
- Order: Trochida
- Superfamily: Trochoidea
- Family: Phasianellidae
- Subfamily: Tricoliinae
- Genus: Eulithidium
- Species: E. pulloides

Binomial name
- Eulithidium pulloides (Carpenter, 1865)

Synonyms
- Eulithidium pulloide [sic] (misspelling); Phasianella compta var. pulloides Carpenter, 1865 (original combination); Tricolia pulloides (Carpenter, 1865)

Species of gastropod

Eulithidium pulloides is a species of small sea snail with calcareous opercula, a marine gastropod mollusk in the family Phasianellidae, the pheasant snails.

== Description ==
The shell grows to a height of 2.5 mm. The shell is somewhat similar to Tricolia pullus, but is more solid, compact, and has a shorter spire. The suture is distinct.

== Distribution ==
This species occurs in the Pacific Ocean off California.
