= Tricolia pulchella =

Scientific classification
- Kingdom: Animalia
- Phylum: Mollusca
- Class: Gastropoda
- Subclass: Vetigastropoda
- Order: Trochida
- Superfamily: Trochoidea
- Family: Phasianellidae
- Subfamily: Tricoliinae
- Genus: Tricolia
- Species: T. pulchella

Binomial name
- Tricolia pulchella (Récluz, 1843)

Species of gastropod

Tricolia pulchella is a species of small sea snail with calcareous opercula, a marine gastropod mollusk in the family Phasianellidae, the pheasant snails.

== Description ==
The shell grows to a height of 7 mm.

== Habitat ==
This species is found in the following habitats:

- Brackish
- Marine

== Distribution ==
This species occurs in the Mediterranean Sea and in the Black Sea.
