= Tricolia indica =

Scientific classification
- Kingdom: Animalia
- Phylum: Mollusca
- Class: Gastropoda
- Subclass: Vetigastropoda
- Order: Trochida
- Superfamily: Trochoidea
- Family: Phasianellidae
- Subfamily: Tricoliinae
- Genus: Tricolia
- Species: T. indica

Binomial name
- Tricolia indica Winckworth, 1940

Species of gastropod

Tricolia indica is a species of small sea snail with calcareous opercula, a marine gastropod mollusk in the family Phasianellidae, the pheasant snails.

== Distribution ==
This species occurs in the Eastern Indian Ocean in the intertidal zone off India.
