= Tricolia tomlini =

Scientific classification
- Kingdom: Animalia
- Phylum: Mollusca
- Class: Gastropoda
- Subclass: Vetigastropoda
- Order: Trochida
- Superfamily: Trochoidea
- Family: Phasianellidae
- Subfamily: Tricoliinae
- Genus: Tricolia
- Species: T. tomlini

Binomial name
- Tricolia tomlini (Gatliff & Gabriel, 1921)

Synonyms
- Phasianella tomlini Gatliff & Gabriel, 1921; Tricolia irritans Thiele, J., 1930

Species of gastropod

Tricolia tomlini is a species of small sea snail with calcareous opercula, a marine gastropod mollusk in the family Phasianellidae, the pheasant snails.

== Description ==
The shell grows to a height of 6.5 mm.

== Distribution ==
This marine species occurs off South Australia and Western Australia.
