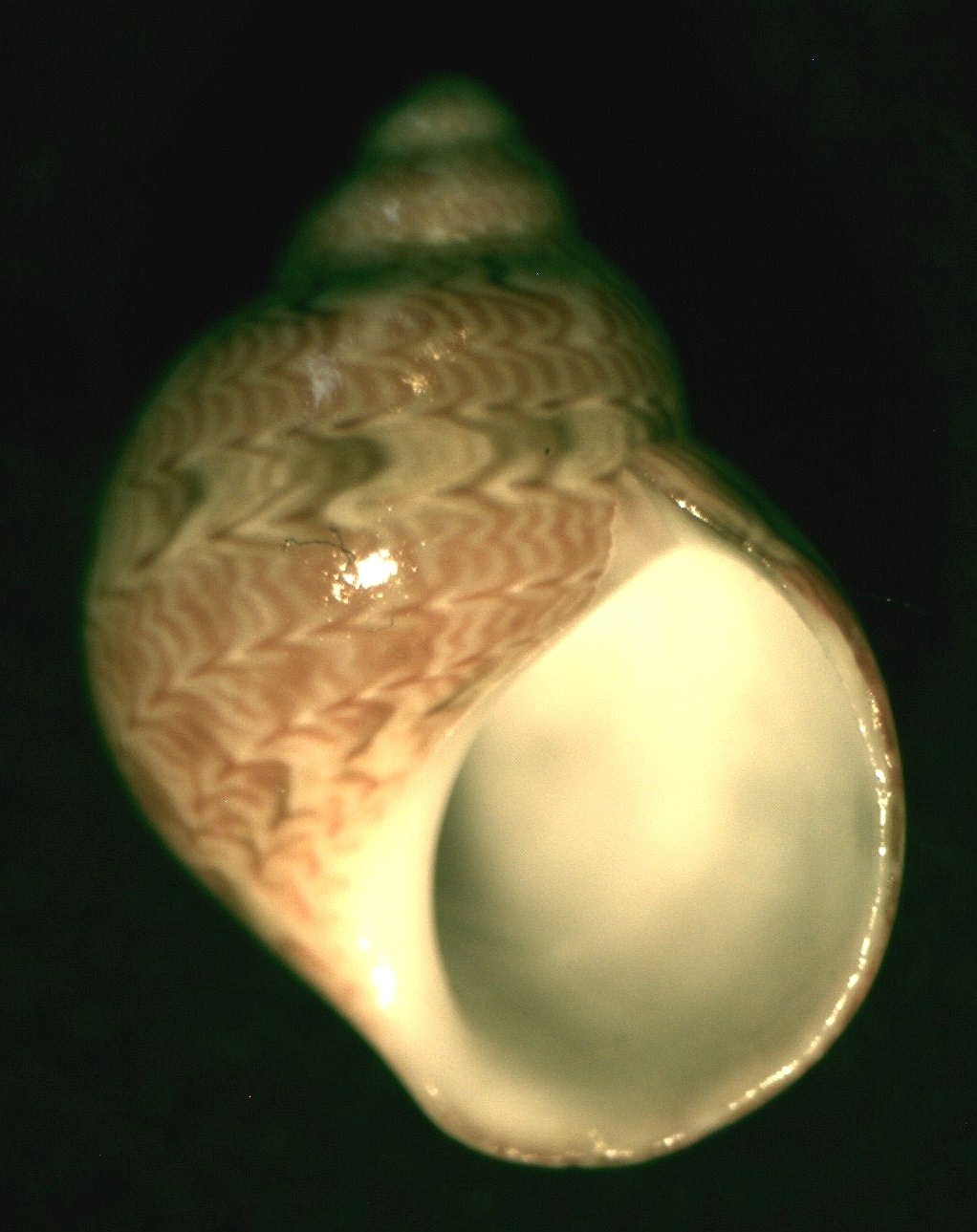
- Apertural view of a shell of Tricolia gabiniana

Scientific classification
- Kingdom: Animalia
- Phylum: Mollusca
- Class: Gastropoda
- Subclass: Vetigastropoda
- Order: Trochida
- Superfamily: Trochoidea
- Family: Phasianellidae
- Subfamily: Tricoliinae
- Genus: Tricolia
- Species: T. gabiniana

Binomial name
- Tricolia gabiniana (Cotton & Godfrey, 1938)

= Tricolia gabiniana =

Species of gastropod

Tricolia gabiniana is a species of small sea snail with calcareous opercula, a marine gastropod mollusk in the family Phasianellidae, the pheasant snails.

== Description ==
The height of the shell reaches 7 mm.

== Distribution ==
This marine species occurs in the intertidal zone off Western Australia.
