= Tricolia miniata =

Scientific classification
- Kingdom: Animalia
- Phylum: Mollusca
- Class: Gastropoda
- Subclass: Vetigastropoda
- Order: Trochida
- Family: Phasianellidae
- Genus: Tricolia
- Species: T. miniata

Binomial name
- Tricolia miniata (Monterosato, 1884)

Species of gastropod

Tricolia miniata is a species of sea snail, a marine gastropod mollusk in the family Phasianellidae.

== Distribution ==
This species occurs in the Eastern Atlantic Ocean off Portugal, off the Strait of Gibraltar and in the Southern Mediterranean Sea, found on brown algae Ericaria selaginoides (Linnaeus) Molinari & Guiry 2020 (syn. Cystoseira tamariscifolia (Hudson) Papenfuss, 1950).
