= T. kochii =

T. kochii may refer to:

- Tricolia kochii, a sea snail species
- Trochus kochii, a sea snail species

== Synonyms ==
- Telesto kochii, a synonym of Toxidia peron, a butterfly species
- Titanoeca kochii, a synonym of Titanoeca quadriguttata, a spider species
