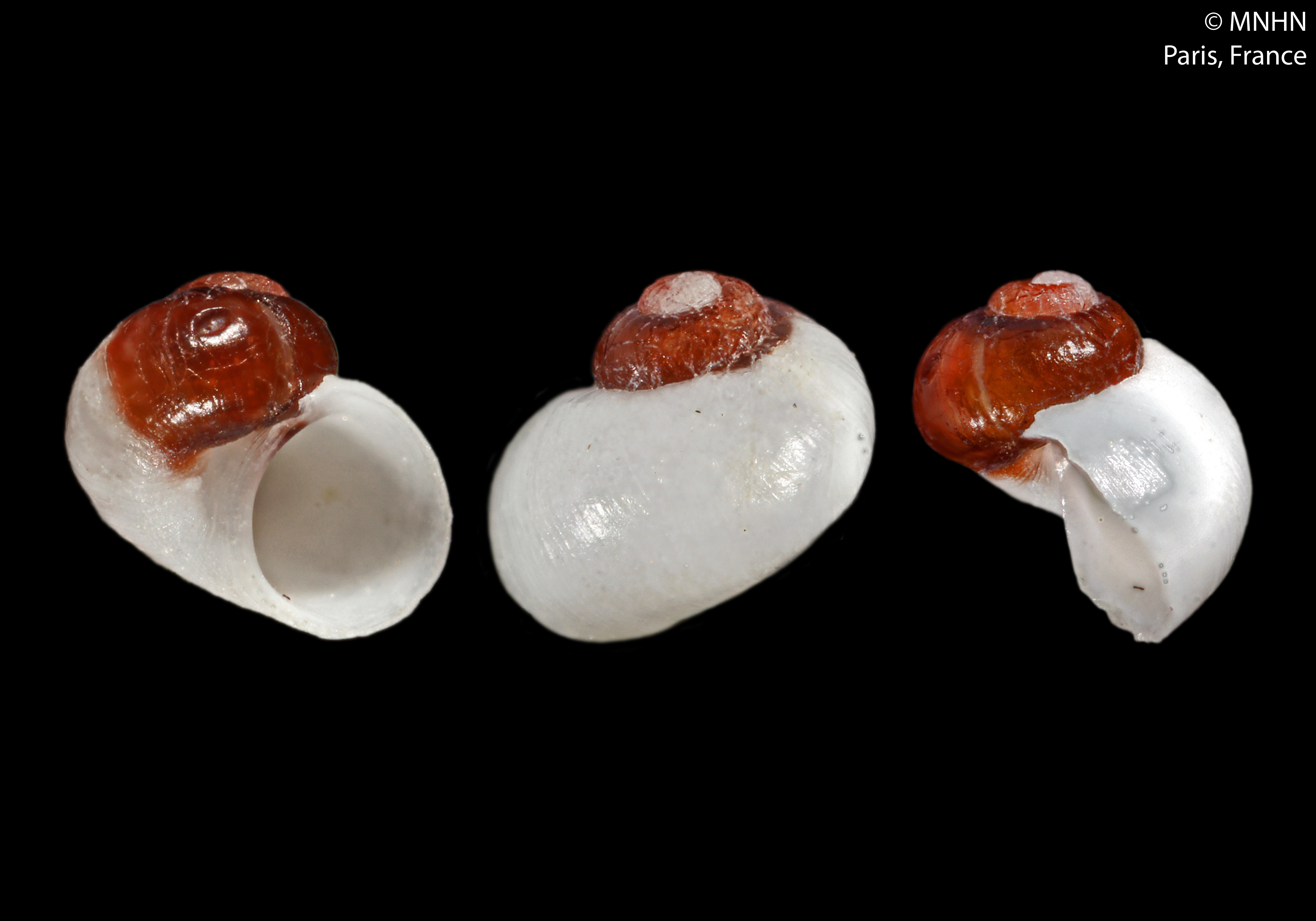
- Shell of Tricolia nordsiecki (syntype at MNHN, Paris)

Scientific classification
- Kingdom: Animalia
- Phylum: Mollusca
- Class: Gastropoda
- Subclass: Vetigastropoda
- Order: Trochida
- Family: Phasianellidae
- Genus: Tricolia
- Species: T. nordsiecki

Binomial name
- Tricolia nordsiecki (Talavera, 1978)

Synonyms
- Skenea trochoides nordsiecki Talavera 1978 (basionym); Skenea trochoides selvagensis Nordsieck & Talavera 1979

= Tricolia nordsiecki =

Species of gastropod

Tricolia nordsiecki is a species of sea snail, a marine gastropod mollusk in the family Phasianellidae.

== Description ==
The height of the shell reaches 2 mm.

== Distribution ==
This marine species occurs off the Strait of Gibraltar and the Canary Islands.
