= Tricolia tristis =

Scientific classification
- Kingdom: Animalia
- Phylum: Mollusca
- Class: Gastropoda
- Subclass: Vetigastropoda
- Order: Trochida
- Superfamily: Trochoidea
- Family: Phasianellidae
- Subfamily: Tricoliinae
- Genus: Tricolia
- Species: T. tristis

Binomial name
- Tricolia tristis (Pilsbry, 1903)

Synonyms
- Phasianella tristis Pilsbry, 1903 (original combination)

Species of gastropod

Tricolia tristis is a species of small sea snail with calcareous opercula, a marine gastropod mollusk in the family Phasianellidae, the pheasant snails.

== Distribution ==
This marine species occurs off Japan.
