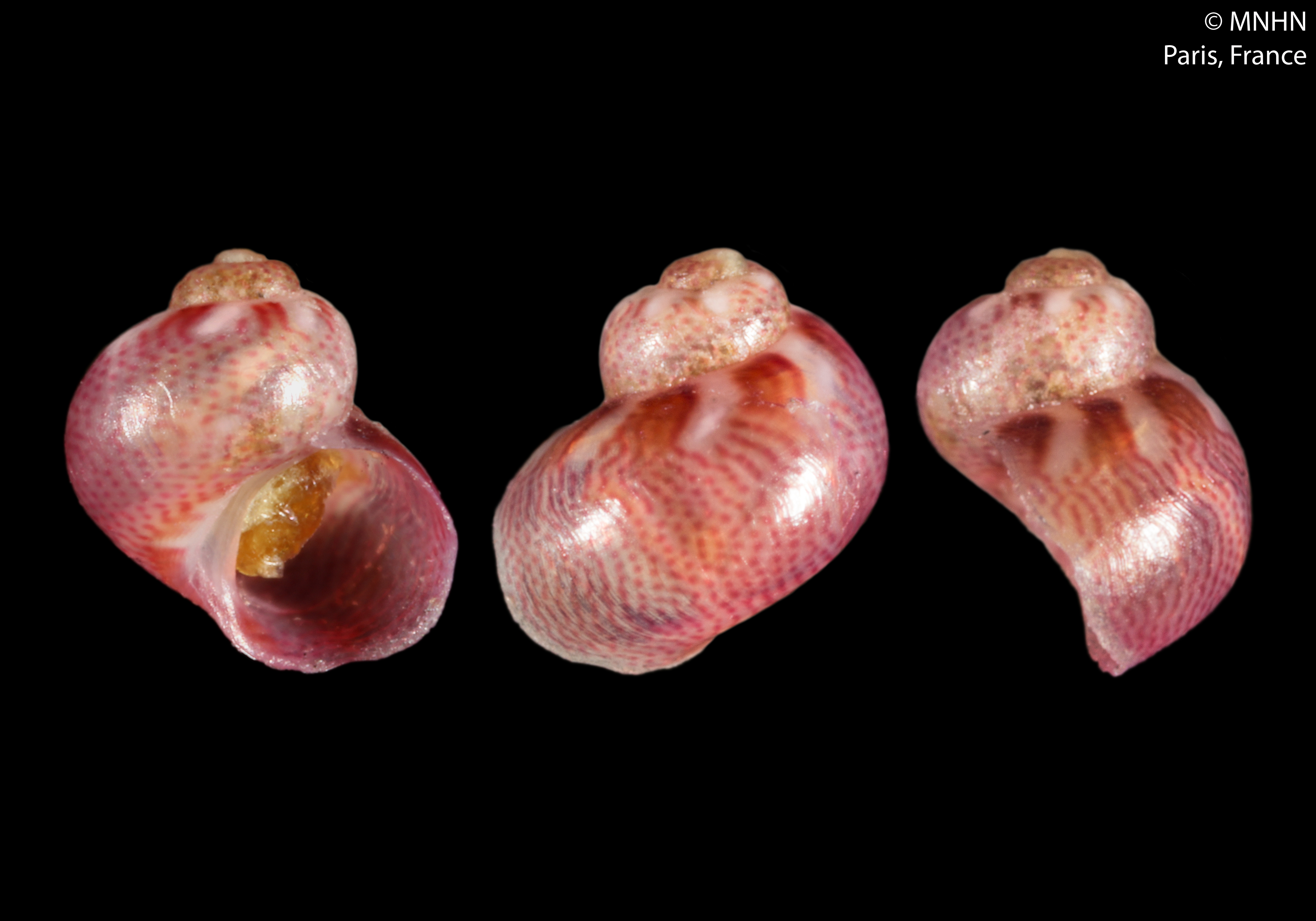
- Shell of Tricolia punctura (holotype at MNHN, Paris)

Scientific classification
- Kingdom: Animalia
- Phylum: Mollusca
- Class: Gastropoda
- Subclass: Vetigastropoda
- Order: Trochida
- Family: Phasianellidae
- Genus: Tricolia
- Species: T. punctura

Binomial name
- Tricolia punctura Gofas, 1993

= Tricolia punctura =

Species of gastropod

Tricolia punctura is a species of sea snail, a marine gastropod mollusk in the family Phasianellidae.

== Description ==
The length of the shell attains 1 mm.

== Distribution ==
This species occurs in the Mediterranean Sea off Italy and Corsica.
