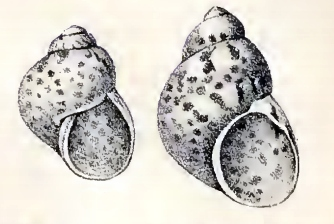
- Drawing with two varieties of a shell of Tricolia petiti

Scientific classification
- Kingdom: Animalia
- Phylum: Mollusca
- Class: Gastropoda
- Subclass: Vetigastropoda
- Order: Trochida
- Family: Phasianellidae
- Genus: Tricolia
- Species: T. petiti

Binomial name
- Tricolia petiti (Craven, 1882)

Synonyms
- Phasianella petiti Craven, 1882 (original combination)

= Tricolia petiti =

Species of gastropod

Tricolia petiti is a species of sea snail, a marine gastropod mollusk in the family Phasianellidae. The species was originally named Phasianella petiti by Craven in 1882.

== Description ==
The shell grows to a height of 7 mm. The shining shell is very small. It has a very narrow rim and is microscopically spirally striate. Its color is corneous with irregular spots of reddish brown, except immediately below the sutures, where they are replaced by a band of alternate oblique white, cream and reddish flammules. There are about four, very rapidly increasing whorls. The apex is obtuse. The subcircular aperture is colored inside, the same as on the outside. The white columella is a little thickened. The suture is deep. There is sometimes a band of large blotches on the periphery.

== Distribution ==
This species occurs in the Atlantic Ocean off Gabon, Angola and the mouth of the Congo River.
