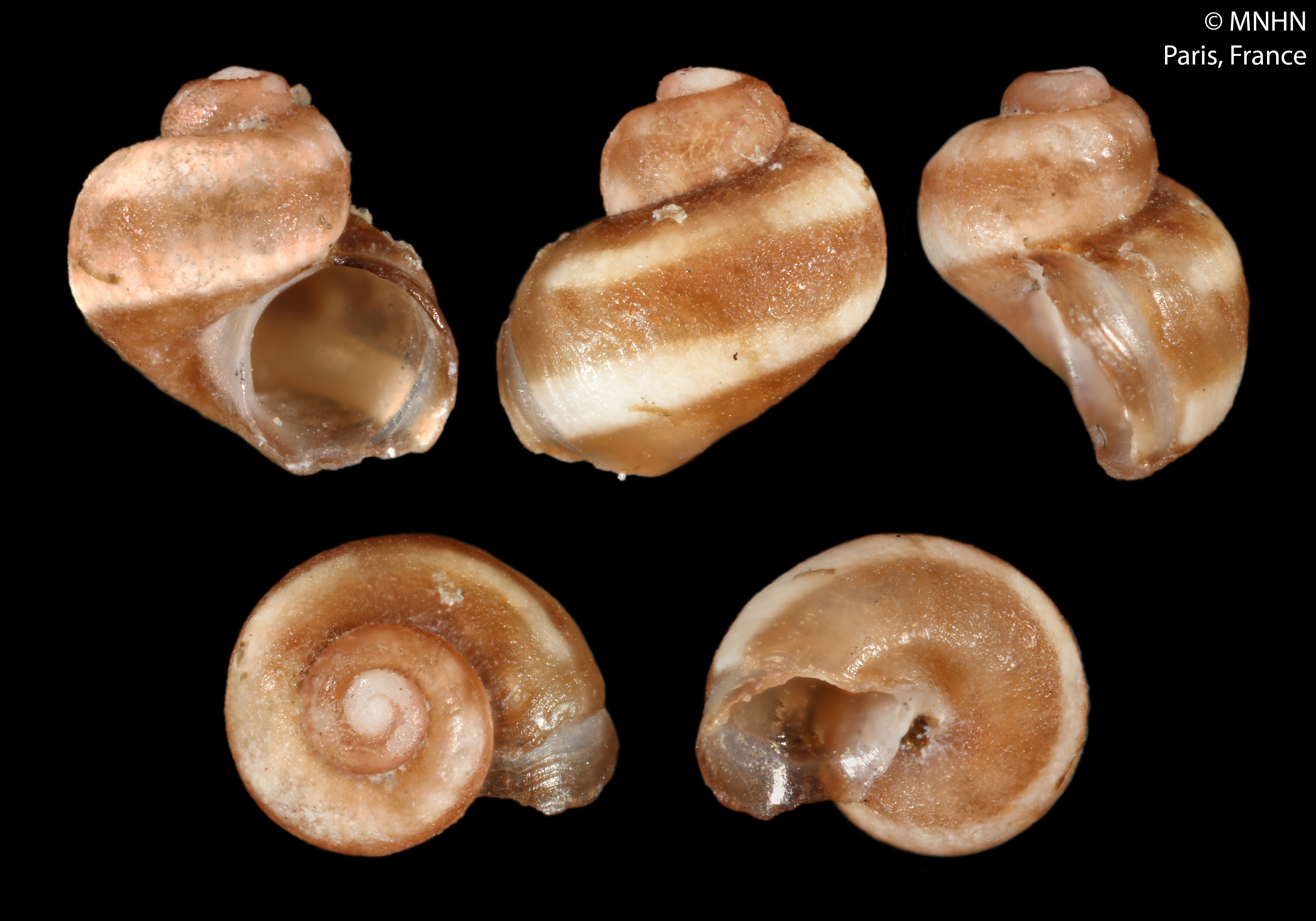
- Shell of Tricolia algoidea (syntype at MNHN, Paris)

Scientific classification
- Kingdom: Animalia
- Phylum: Mollusca
- Class: Gastropoda
- Subclass: Vetigastropoda
- Order: Trochida
- Family: Phasianellidae
- Genus: Tricolia
- Species: T. algoidea

Binomial name
- Tricolia algoidea (Pallary, 1920)

Synonyms
- Epheriella algoidea Pallary, 1920; Lacuna algoidea P.M. Pallary, 1912

= Tricolia algoidea =

Species of gastropod

Tricolia algoidea is a species of small sea snail, a marine gastropod mollusk in the family Phasianellidae.

== Description ==
The shell grows to a height of 1.5 mm.

== Distribution ==
This species occurs in the Eastern Atlantic Ocean and in the Mediterranean Sea off Morocco.
