= Tricolia adusta =

Scientific classification
- Kingdom: Animalia
- Phylum: Mollusca
- Class: Gastropoda
- Subclass: Vetigastropoda
- Order: Trochida
- Family: Phasianellidae
- Genus: Tricolia
- Species: T. adusta

Binomial name
- Tricolia adusta Nangammbi & Herbert, 2006

Species of gastropod

Tricolia adusta is a species of sea snail, a marine gastropod mollusk in the family Phasianellidae.

== Distribution ==
- KwaZulu-Natal, South Africa
