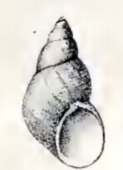
- Drawing with an apertural view of a shell of Eulithidium comptum

Scientific classification
- Kingdom: Animalia
- Phylum: Mollusca
- Class: Gastropoda
- Subclass: Vetigastropoda
- Order: Trochida
- Superfamily: Trochoidea
- Family: Phasianellidae
- Subfamily: Tricoliinae
- Genus: Eulithidium
- Species: E. comptum

Binomial name
- Eulithidium comptum (Gould, 1855)

Synonyms
- Tricolia compta (Gould, 1855); Usatricolia compta (Gould, 1855)

= Eulithidium comptum =

Species of gastropod

Eulithidium comptum, the Californian banded pheasant shell, is a species of small sea snail with calcareous opercula, a marine gastropod mollusk in the family Phasianellidae, the pheasant snails.

== Description ==
This small, high-spired shell grows to a height varying between 6 mm and 10 mm. It has a pointed-oblong shape. It is somewhat solid, yellowish, pinkish or whitish, more or less clouded longitudinally with purple, dull pink or gray. It is marked with numerous narrow close revolving descending lines of purple, pink or drab, sometimes conspicuously flammulated below the sutures, and broadly transversely fasciate on its base. The 5-6 smooth whorls are closely coiled above, with shallow sutures. The body whorl is more rapidly descending, separated by a deep suture. The aperture is usually less than half the length of shell. It is very oblique, short ovate with the inner margin arcuate. The narrow umbilical region is excavated and generally minutely perforate. The operculum is white, inside stained with blue above.

The radula is similar to that of Tricolia pullus (Linnaeus, 1758) but has only 4 lateral teeth on either side, by atrophy of the narrow outer one.

== Distribution ==
It is found in abundant numbers on eelgrass in shallow water in the Pacific Ocean from Southern California to northern Baja California.
