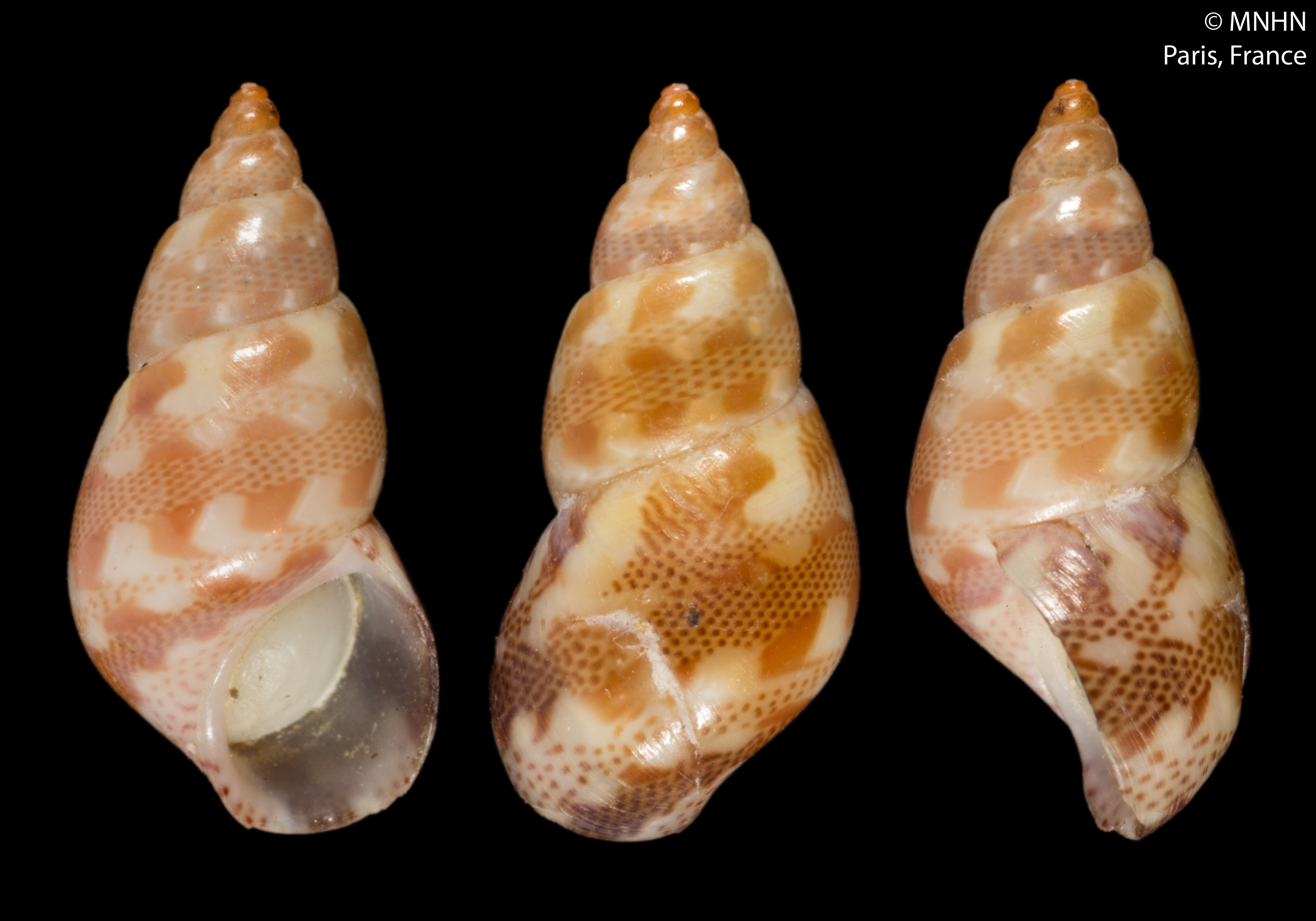
- Shell of Tricolia tenuis (lectotype at MNHN, Paris)

Scientific classification
- Kingdom: Animalia
- Phylum: Mollusca
- Class: Gastropoda
- Subclass: Vetigastropoda
- Order: Trochida
- Family: Phasianellidae
- Genus: Tricolia
- Species: T. tenuis

Binomial name
- Tricolia tenuis (Michaud, 1829)

Synonyms
- Phasianella intermedia Scacchi, 1836; Phasianella pulla var. hoberti Brusina, 1865 ·; Phasianella pulla var. striata Brusina, 1865 ·; Phasianella tenuis Michaud, 1829; Phasianella tenuis Philippi, 1844 ·(synonym and junior homonym of Phasianella tenuis Michaud, 1829); Phasianella tenuis var. fusca Pallary, 1900; Phasianella tenuis var. lactea Bucquoy, Dautzenberg & Dollfus, 1884; Tricolia candidula Monterosato, 1917 (dubious synonym); Tricolia hoberti (Brusina, 1865); Tricolia hoberti var. carissima Monterosato, 1917; Tricolia tenuis var. meleagris Coen, 1933; Tricoliella hoberti (Brusina, 1865); Tricoliella hoberti var. alternata Monterosato, 1884 (synonym); Tricoliella hoberti var. eximia Monterosato, 1884; Tricoliella hoberti var. incomparabilis Monterosato, 1884; Tricoliella hoberti var. major Monterosato, 1884; Tricoliella hoberti var. minor Monterosato, 1884

= Tricolia tenuis =

Species of gastropod

Tricolia tenuis is a species of sea snail, a marine gastropod mollusk in the family Phasianellidae.

== Description ==
The size of the shell varies between 6 mm and 11 mm. The oval, elongated shell is rather thin, and shining. The elevated spire has a conic shape. It is composed of 4–5 somewhat convex whorls, separated by slightly impressed sutures. The aperture is rounded oval. The columella is arcuate. The color of the shell is yellowish or rose, with red and white flammules and decurrent lines, sometimes punctate with red.

== Distribution ==
This marine species occurs in the Mediterranean Sea, the Black Sea; in the Atlantic Ocean off the Azores, Cape Verde Islands and West Africa.
