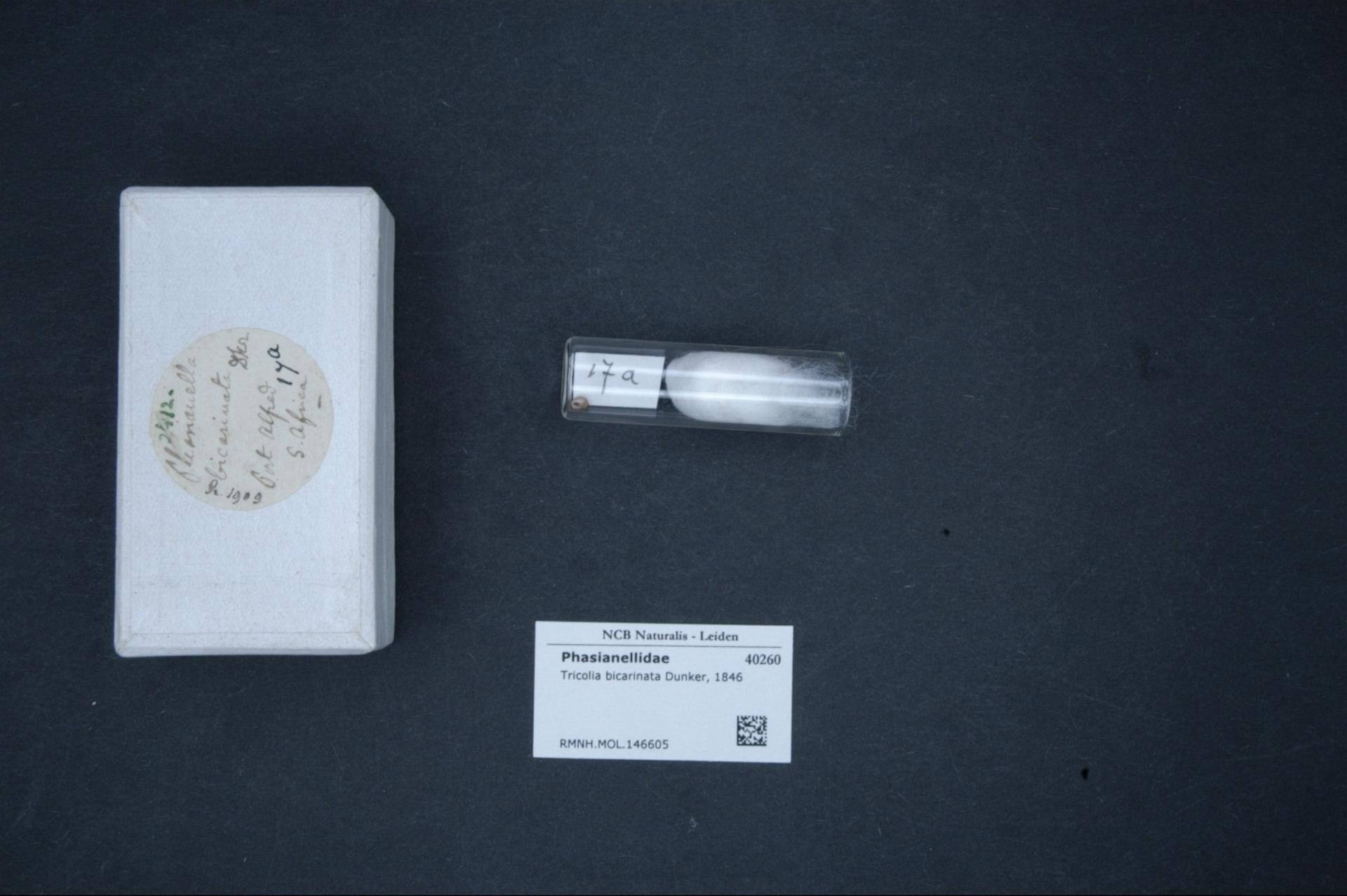

Scientific classification
- Kingdom: Animalia
- Phylum: Mollusca
- Class: Gastropoda
- Subclass: Vetigastropoda
- Order: Trochida
- Superfamily: Trochoidea
- Family: Phasianellidae
- Subfamily: Tricoliinae
- Genus: Tricolia
- Species: T. bicarinata

Binomial name
- Tricolia bicarinata (Dunker, 1846)

Synonyms
- Tricolia tropidophora (Tomlin, 1931)

= Tricolia bicarinata =

Species of gastropod

Tricolia bicarinata is a species of small sea snail with calcareous opercula, a marine gastropod mollusk in the family Phasianellidae, the pheasant snails.

== Distribution ==
This marine species occurs off South Africa.
