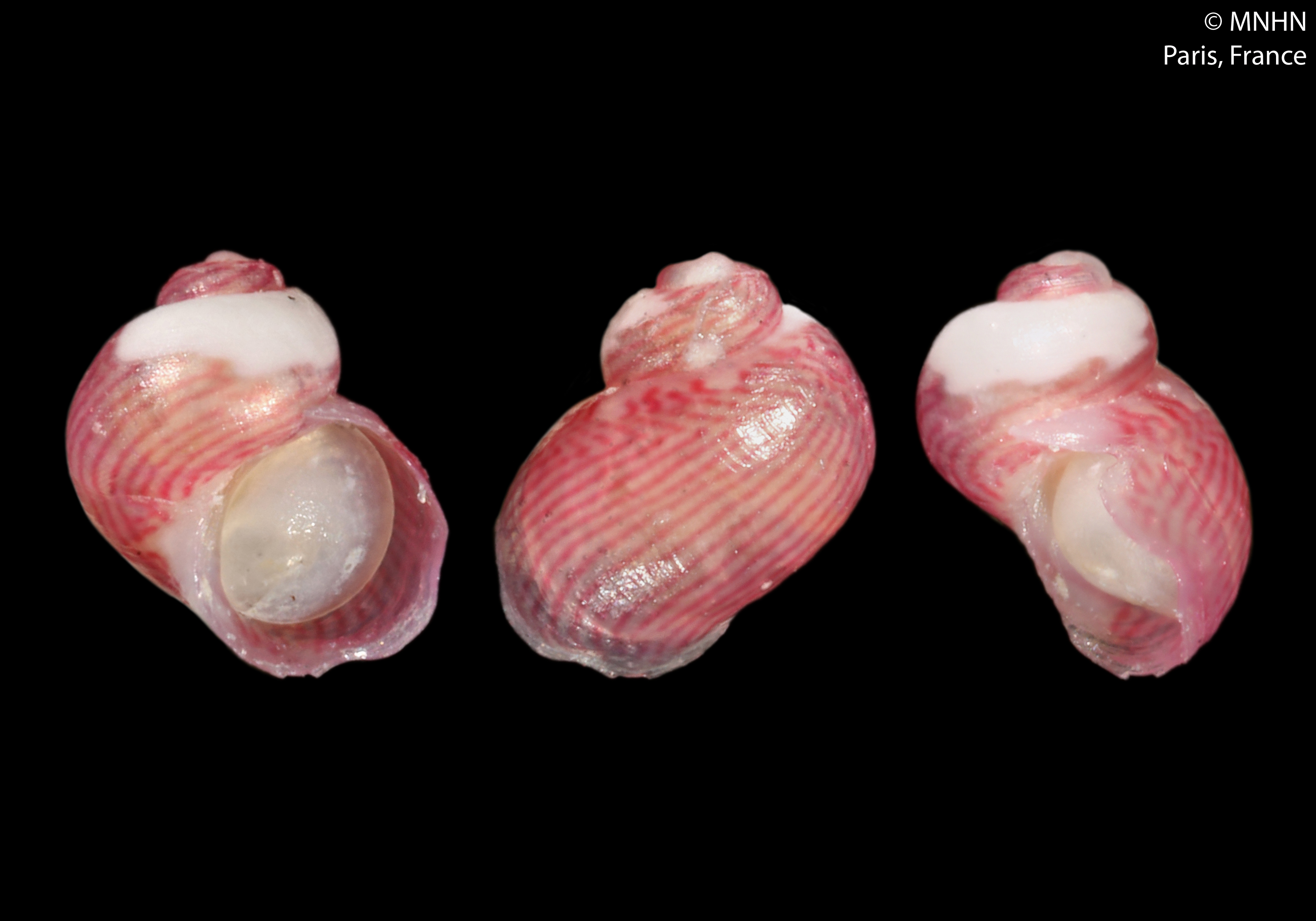
- Shell of Tricolia entomocheila (holotype at MNHN, Paris)

Scientific classification
- Kingdom: Animalia
- Phylum: Mollusca
- Class: Gastropoda
- Subclass: Vetigastropoda
- Order: Trochida
- Family: Phasianellidae
- Genus: Tricolia
- Species: T. entomocheila

Binomial name
- Tricolia entomocheila Gofas, 1993

= Tricolia entomocheila =

Species of gastropod

Tricolia entomocheila is a species of sea snail, a marine gastropod mollusk in the family Phasianellidae.

== Description ==
The height of the shell reaches 2 mm.

== Distribution ==
This species occurs in the Western Mediterranean Sea and off Atlantic Morocco.
