= Tricolia elongata =

Scientific classification
- Kingdom: Animalia
- Phylum: Mollusca
- Class: Gastropoda
- Subclass: Vetigastropoda
- Order: Trochida
- Family: Phasianellidae
- Genus: Tricolia
- Species: T. elongata

Binomial name
- Tricolia elongata (Krauss, 1848)

Synonyms
- Phasianella elongata Krauss, 1848; Tricolia alfredensis (Turton, 1932)

Species of gastropod

Tricolia elongata is a species of sea snail, a marine gastropod mollusk in the family Phasianellidae.

== Distribution ==
This marine species occurs in the Indian Ocean off southern Mozambique and north-eastern South Africa.
