= Tricolia ios =

Scientific classification
- Kingdom: Animalia
- Phylum: Mollusca
- Class: Gastropoda
- Subclass: Vetigastropoda
- Order: Trochida
- Superfamily: Trochoidea
- Family: Phasianellidae
- Subfamily: Tricoliinae
- Genus: Tricolia
- Species: T. ios

Binomial name
- Tricolia ios Robertson, 1985

Species of gastropod

Tricolia ios is a species of small sea snail with calcareous opercula, a marine gastropod mollusk in the family Phasianellidae, the pheasant snails.

== Distribution ==
This species occurs in the subtidal zone in the Red Sea and in the Indian Ocean off Somalia, Kenya, Tanzania and Mozambique.
