= Tricolia rosea =

- Drawing with an apertural view of a shell of Tricolia rosea

Scientific classification
- Kingdom: Animalia
- Phylum: Mollusca
- Class: Gastropoda
- Subclass: Vetigastropoda
- Order: Trochida
- Superfamily: Trochoidea
- Family: Phasianellidae
- Subfamily: Tricoliinae
- Genus: Tricolia
- Species: T. rosea

Binomial name
- Tricolia rosea (Angas, 1867)

Synonyms
- Pellax rosea auct.; Eutropia (Tricolia) rosea Angas, 1867; Phasianella rosea Angas, 1867

Species of gastropod

Tricolia rosea, common name the rosy pheasant, is a species of small sea snail with calcareous opercula, a marine gastropod mollusk in the family Phasianellidae, the pheasant snails.

== Description ==
The height of the shell varies between 2 mm and 5 mm. The minute shell is thin, shining and has an ovate shape. It has a uniform deep rosy color throughout. The four whorls are somewhat flattened at the upper part, then convex. The columella is white. The edge and the outer lip are stained with a line of dark rose.

== Distribution ==
This marine species occurs off Western Australia, New South Wales and Tasmania.
