= Tricolia insignis =

Scientific classification
- Kingdom: Animalia
- Phylum: Mollusca
- Class: Gastropoda
- Subclass: Vetigastropoda
- Order: Trochida
- Superfamily: Trochoidea
- Family: Phasianellidae
- Subfamily: Tricoliinae
- Genus: Tricolia
- Species: T. insignis

Binomial name
- Tricolia insignis (Turton, 1932)

Species of gastropod

Tricolia insignis is a species of small sea snail with calcareous opercula, a marine gastropod mollusk in the family Phasianellidae, the pheasant snails.

== Description ==
The shell reaches a height of 3.5 mm.

== Distribution ==
This marine species occurs off southeast South Africa.
