= Tricolia landinii =

Scientific classification
- Kingdom: Animalia
- Phylum: Mollusca
- Class: Gastropoda
- Subclass: Vetigastropoda
- Order: Trochida
- Family: Phasianellidae
- Genus: Tricolia
- Species: T. landinii

Binomial name
- Tricolia landinii Bogi & Campani, 2007

Species of gastropod

Tricolia landinii is a species of sea snail, a marine gastropod mollusk in the family Phasianellidae.

== Distribution ==
This species occurs in the Mediterranean Sea off Sicily.
