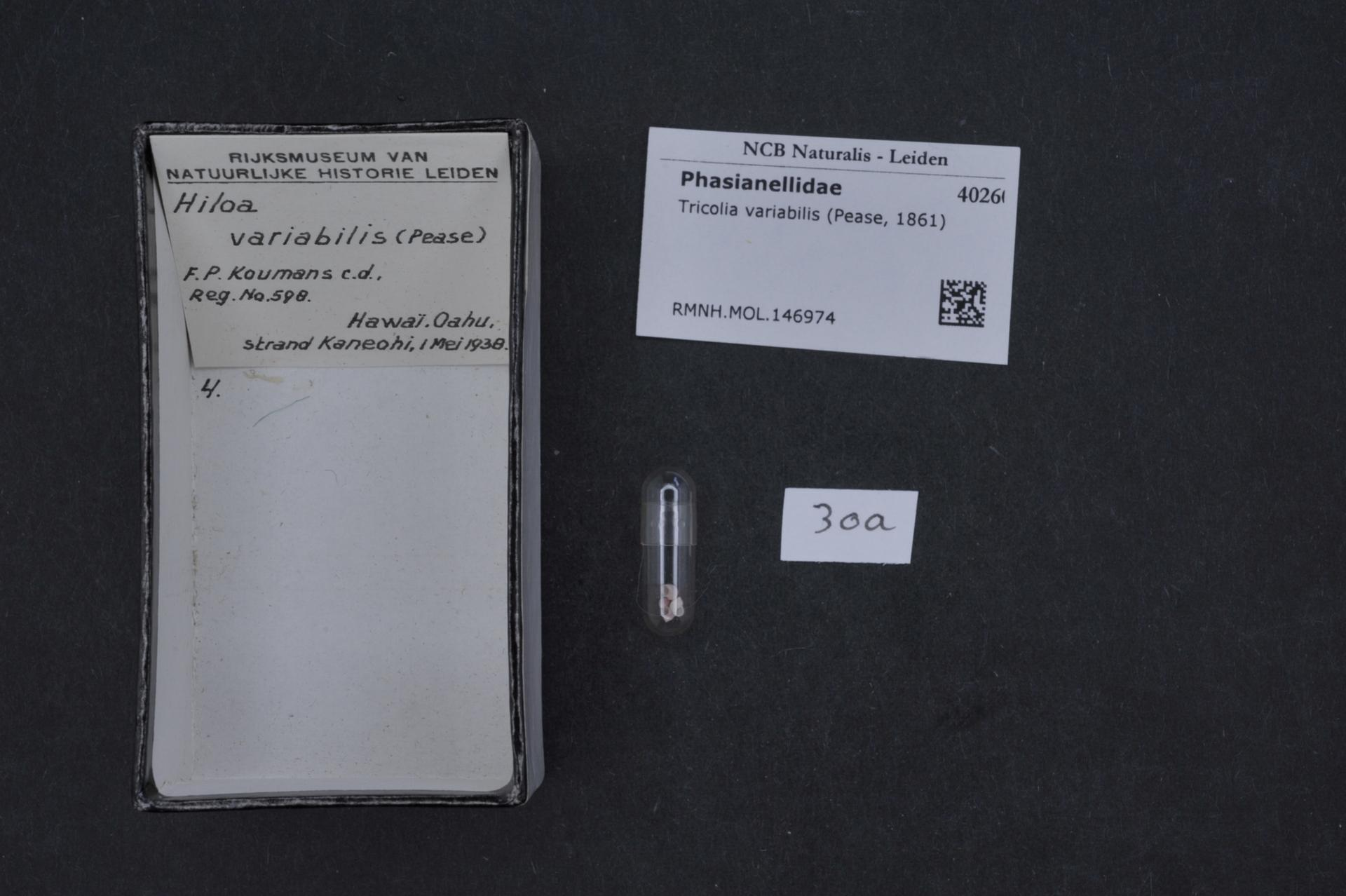
- Shell of Hiloa variabilis (specimen at Naturalis Biodiversity Center)

Scientific classification
- Kingdom: Animalia
- Phylum: Mollusca
- Class: Gastropoda
- Subclass: Vetigastropoda
- Order: Trochida
- Superfamily: Trochoidea
- Family: Phasianellidae
- Genus: Hiloa
- Species: H. variabilis

Binomial name
- Hiloa variabilis (Pease, 1860)

Synonyms
- Collonia variabilis Pease, 1860 (original combination); Eutropia (Tricolia) virgo Angas, 1867; Eutropia virgo Angas, 1867; Phasianella gregaria Laseron, C.F., 1955; Phasianella megastoma Pilsbry, 1895 (junior synonym); Phasianella oligomphala Pilsbry, 1895 (junior synonym); Phasianella thaanumi Pilsbry, 1917; Phasianella variabilis Pease, Pilsbry, 1888; Tricolia bryani Pilsbry, H.A., 1917; Tricolia megastoma Pilsbry, H.A., 1895; Tricolia molokaiensis Pilsbry, H.A., 1917; Tricolia oligomphala (Pilsbry, 1895); Tricolia thaanumi Pilsbry, H.A., 1917; Tricolia variabilis (Pease, 1861); Tricolia virgo Angas, G.F., 1867

= Hiloa variabilis =

Species of gastropod

Hiloa variabilis, common name the minute pheasant, is a species of small sea snail with calcareous opercula, a marine gastropod mollusk in the family Phasianellidae, the pheasant snails.

== Description ==
The thin, ovate, rather solid shell has a moderately long and shining spire. Its height is 5 mm. The 3-4 convexly rounded whorls are marked with very fine oblique longitudinal striae. The inner lip is callous, slightly expanded at the base, indented at the umbilical region and with a groove behind the inner lip. The aperture is ovate. The color of the shell is white, variously painted with pink lines and blotches. These lines are fine, oblique, and extend over a portion of the whorls. They are sometimes flexuous and cover the whole surface. The blotches have a longitudinal shape. The periphery of the body whorl usually ornamented with a row of pink spots. The axis is perforate. The peristome does not project forward at junction of columellar and basal margins.

== Distribution ==
This species occurs in the tropical and temperate Indo-West Pacific, off Hawaii and off Australia.
