= Eulithidium beaui =

Scientific classification
- Kingdom: Animalia
- Phylum: Mollusca
- Class: Gastropoda
- Subclass: Vetigastropoda
- Order: Trochida
- Superfamily: Trochoidea
- Family: Phasianellidae
- Subfamily: Tricoliinae
- Genus: Eulithidium
- Species: E. beaui

Binomial name
- Eulithidium beaui (Robertson, 1958)

Synonyms
- Tricolia affinis beaui Robertson, 1958; Tricolia beaui Robertson, 1958

Species of gastropod

Eulithidium beaui is a species of small sea snail with calcareous opercula, a marine gastropod mollusk in the family Phasianellidae, the pheasant snails.

== Description ==
The shell grows to a height of 7.5 mm.

== Distribution ==
This marine species occurs off Antigua, Martinique, Barbados, and Trinidad and Tobago.
