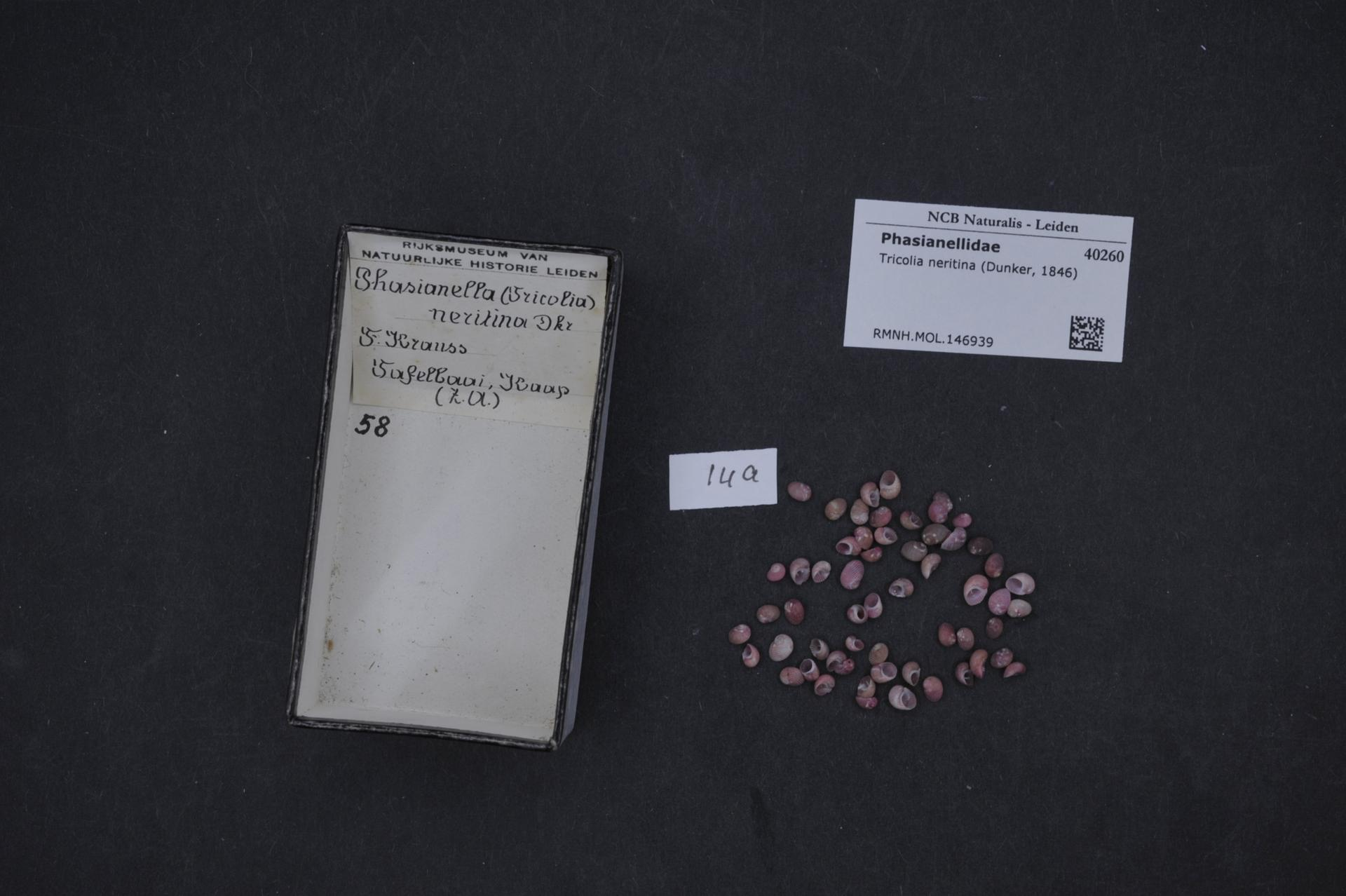

Scientific classification
- Kingdom: Animalia
- Phylum: Mollusca
- Class: Gastropoda
- Subclass: Vetigastropoda
- Order: Trochida
- Family: Phasianellidae
- Genus: Tricolia
- Species: T. neritina

Binomial name
- Tricolia neritina (Dunker, 1846)

Synonyms
- Phasianella neritina Dunker, 1846

= Tricolia neritina =

Species of gastropod

Tricolia neritina is a species of sea snail, a marine gastropod mollusk in the family Phasianellidae.

== Distribution ==
This marine species occurs off Namibia, South Africa and Mozambique.
