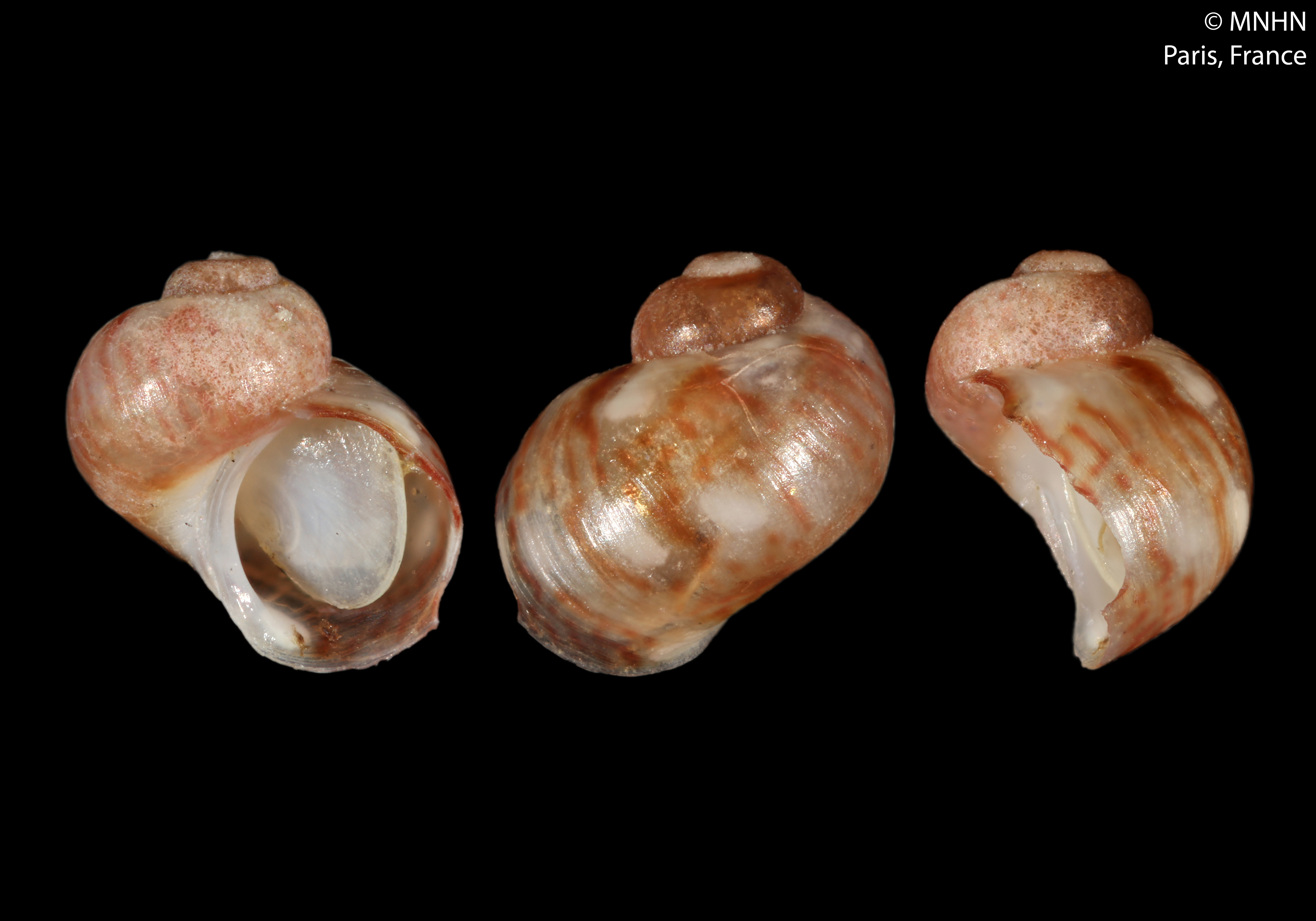
- Shell of Tricolia tingitana (holotype at MNHN, Paris)

Scientific classification
- Kingdom: Animalia
- Phylum: Mollusca
- Class: Gastropoda
- Subclass: Vetigastropoda
- Order: Trochida
- Family: Phasianellidae
- Genus: Tricolia
- Species: T. tingitana

Binomial name
- Tricolia tingitana Gofas, 1982

= Tricolia tingitana =

Species of gastropod

Tricolia tingitana is a species of a small sea snail, a marine gastropod mollusk in the family Phasianellidae.

== Description ==
The length of the shell reaches 1.7 mm.

== Distribution ==
This species occurs in the Eastern Atlantic Ocean and in the Mediterranean Sea.
