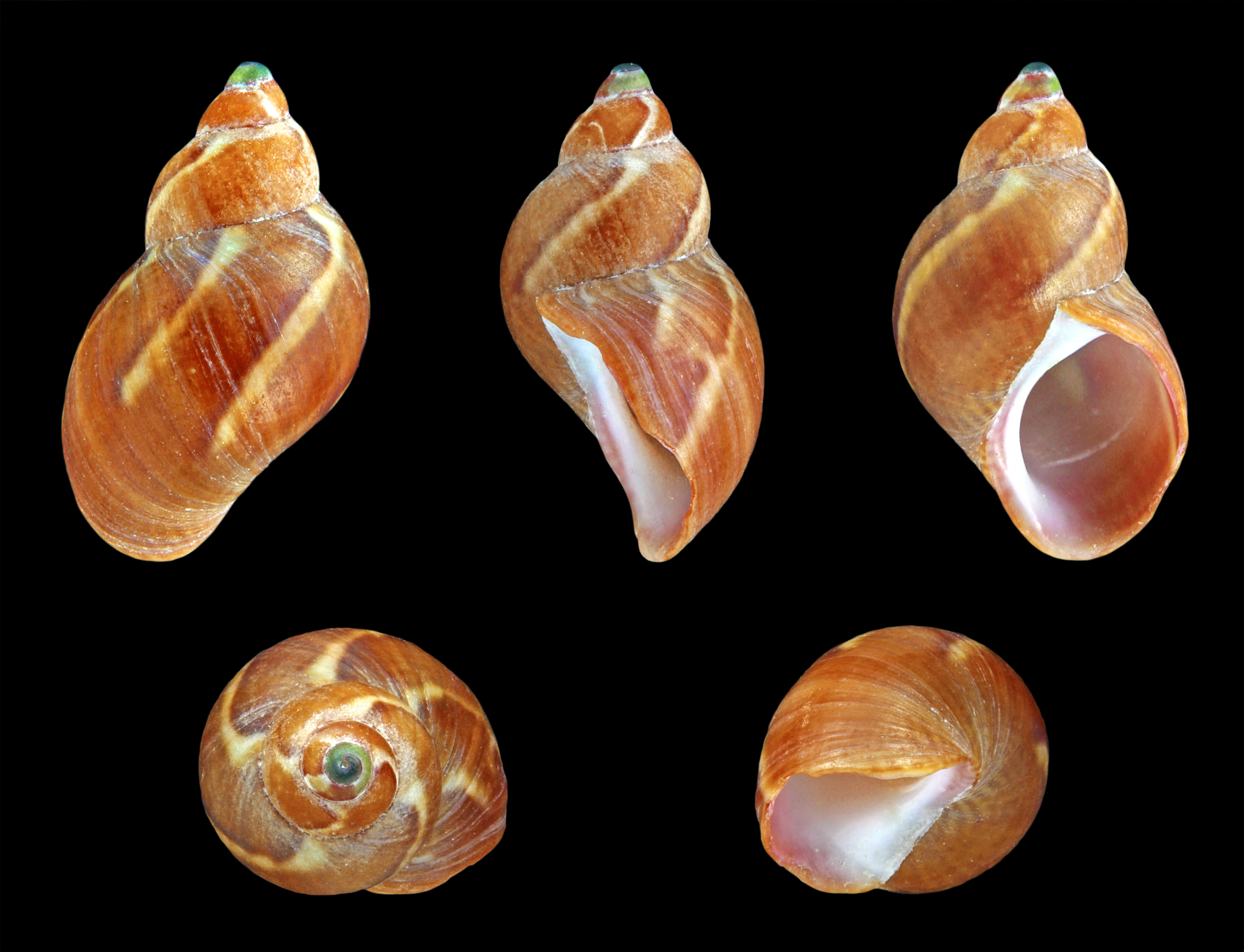

Scientific classification
- Kingdom: Animalia
- Phylum: Mollusca
- Class: Gastropoda
- Subclass: Vetigastropoda
- Order: Trochida
- Family: Phasianellidae
- Genus: Tricolia
- Species: T. capensis

Binomial name
- Tricolia capensis (Dunker, 1846)

Synonyms
- Phasianella capensis Dunker, 1846

= Tricolia capensis =

Species of gastropod

Tricolia capensis, common name the pheasant shell, is a species of sea snail, a marine gastropod mollusk in the family Phasianellidae.

== Description ==
The size of the shell varies between 5 mm and 15 mm.

== Distribution ==
This marine species occurs off Namibia, South Africa and Mozambique.
