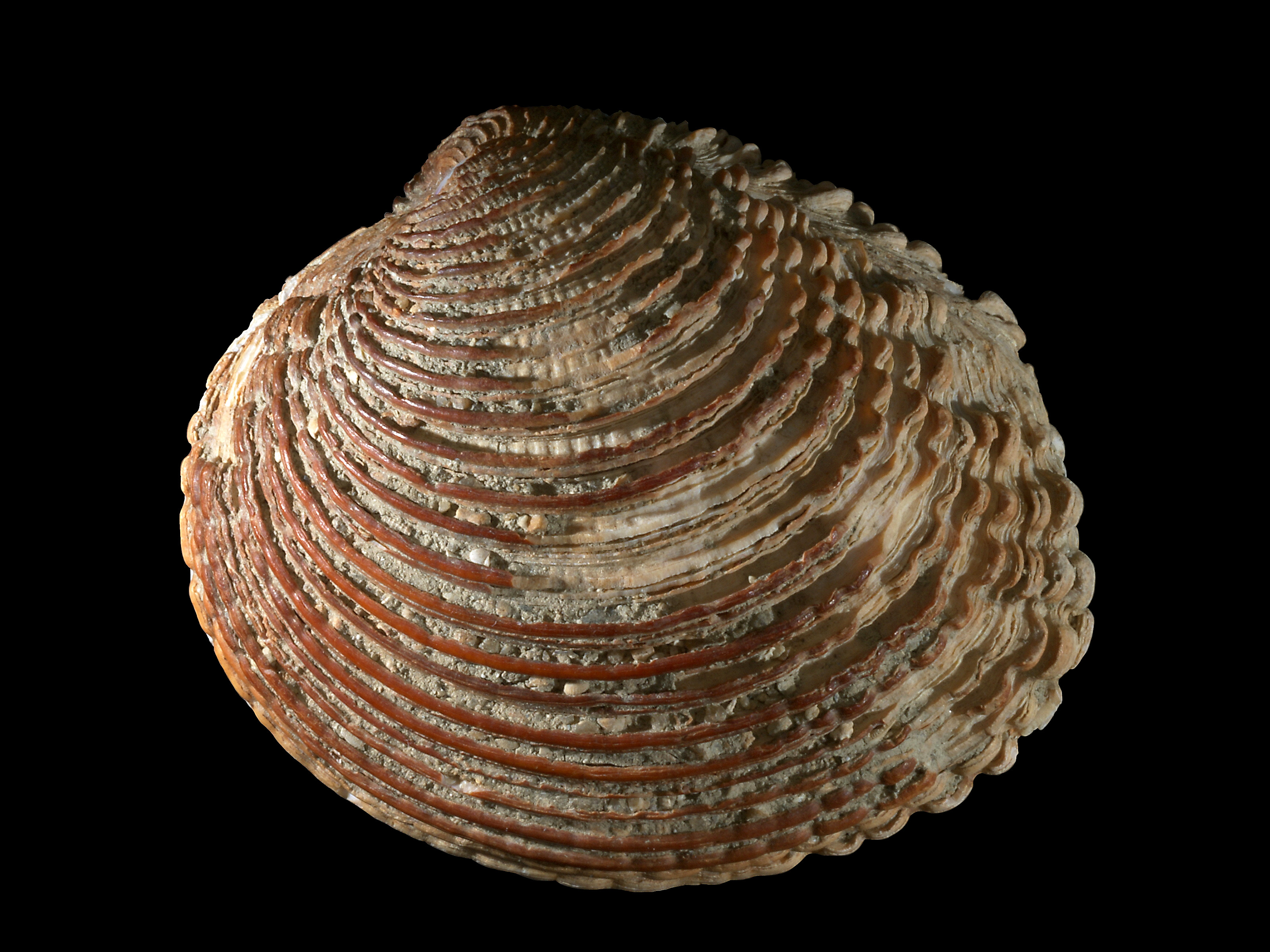

Scientific classification
- Kingdom: Animalia
- Phylum: Mollusca
- Class: Bivalvia
- Order: Venerida
- Family: Veneridae
- Genus: Venus
- Species: V. verrucosa

Binomial name
- Venus verrucosa Linnaeus, 1758

= Venus verrucosa =

Warty venus

Species of bivalve

Venus verrucosa, the warty venus, is a species of saltwater clam. It is a species of marine bivalve mollusc in the family Veneridae, sometimes collectively known as the venus clams.

== Distribution ==
This species is found around the European coast and also the southern African coast, from the Namibian coast to Mozambique, subtidally to 155 m.

== Description ==
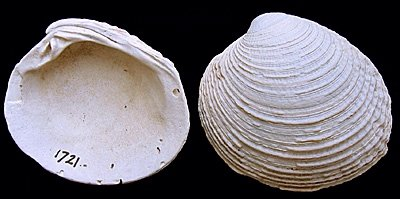
A fossilized shell of V. verrucosa

This animal grows up to 60 mm in diameter. It has a bulky, oval shell with well-defined concentric ridges. The shell edges are knobbly and crossed.

== Economic import and gastronomy ==
Known as praire in France, it is an expensive delicacy there, and harvesting periods and size of catch (both minimum shell size and numbers taken) have had to be strictly regulated for its conservation. It is eaten either raw or baked in the oven with garlic butter.

== Ecology ==
The warty venus burrows in mud and sand.
