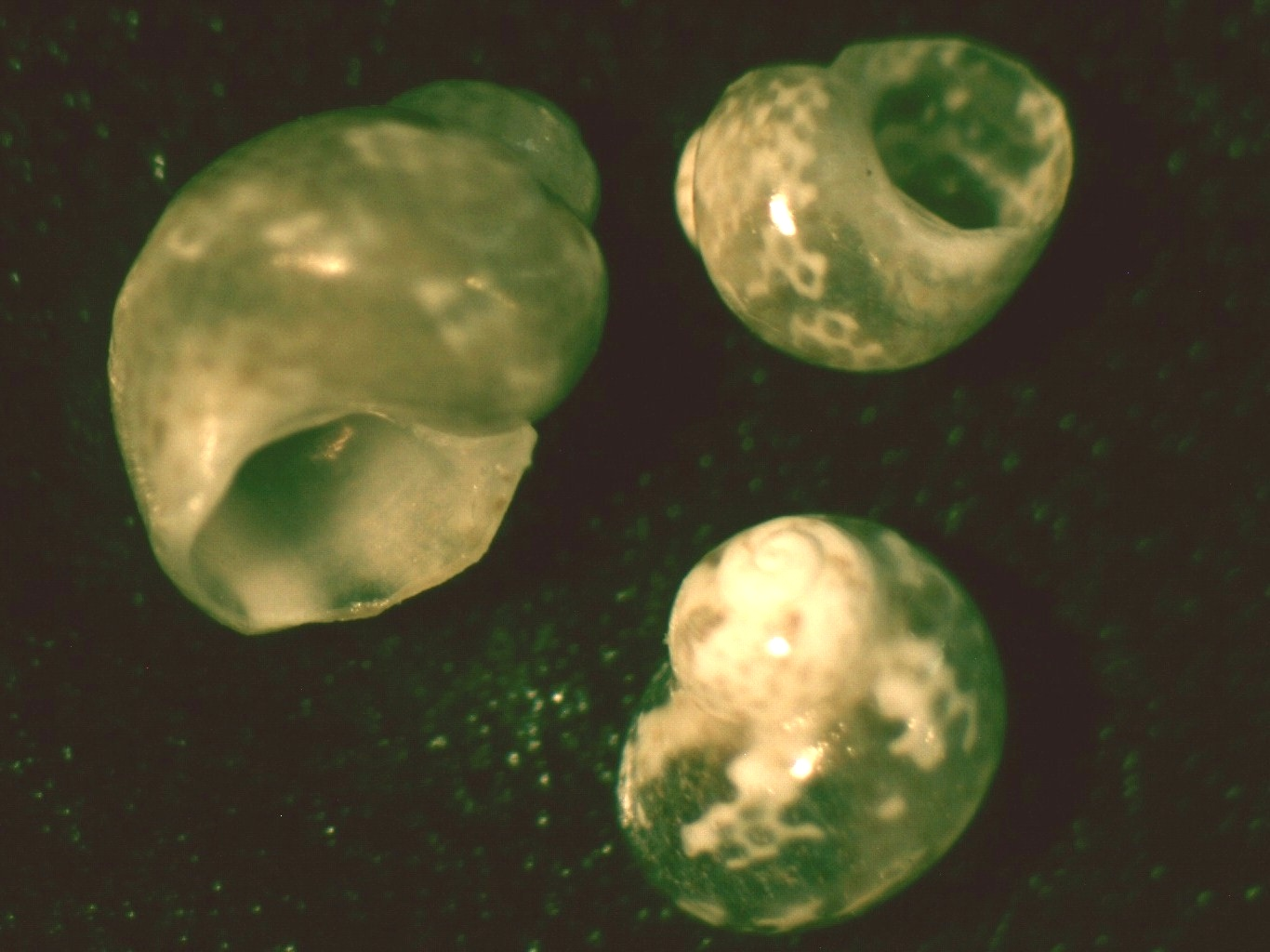
- Views of a shell of Eulithidium bellum

Scientific classification
- Kingdom: Animalia
- Phylum: Mollusca
- Class: Gastropoda
- Subclass: Vetigastropoda
- Order: Trochida
- Family: Phasianellidae
- Genus: Eulithidium
- Species: E. bellum

Binomial name
- Eulithidium bellum (M. Smith, 1937)

Synonyms
- Littorina adamsii Reeve, 1857; Phasianella bella M. Smith, 1937; Tricolia bella (M. Smith, 1937); Tricolia bellum M. Smith, 1937; Tricolia cebeadamsi Nordsieck, 1973; Turbo caboblanquensis Weisbord, 1962; Turbo pulchellus C. B. Adams, 1845

= Eulithidium bellum =

Species of gastropod

Eulithidium bellum, common name the shouldered pheasant shell, is a species of sea snail, a marine gastropod mollusk in the family Phasianellidae.

== Description ==
Th height of the shell varies between 2 mm and 6 mm.

== Distribution ==
This species occurs in the Gulf of Mexico, the Caribbean Sea and the Lesser Antilles; in the Atlantic Ocean off Southern Brazil.
