= Eulithidium pterocladicum =

Scientific classification
- Kingdom: Animalia
- Phylum: Mollusca
- Class: Gastropoda
- Subclass: Vetigastropoda
- Order: Trochida
- Family: Phasianellidae
- Genus: Eulithidium
- Species: E. pterocladicum

Binomial name
- Eulithidium pterocladicum (Robertson, 1958)

Synonyms
- Tricolia affinis pterocladica Robertson, 1958 (original combination); Tricolia pterocladia sic; Tricolia pterocladica Robertson, 1958; Tricolia tessellata auct. non Potiez & Michaud, 1838

Species of gastropod

Eulithidium pterocladicum is a species of sea snail, a marine gastropod mollusk in the family Phasianellidae.

== Description ==
The shell grows to a height of 8 mm.

== Distribution ==
This marine species occurs in the Gulf of Mexico off Florida.
