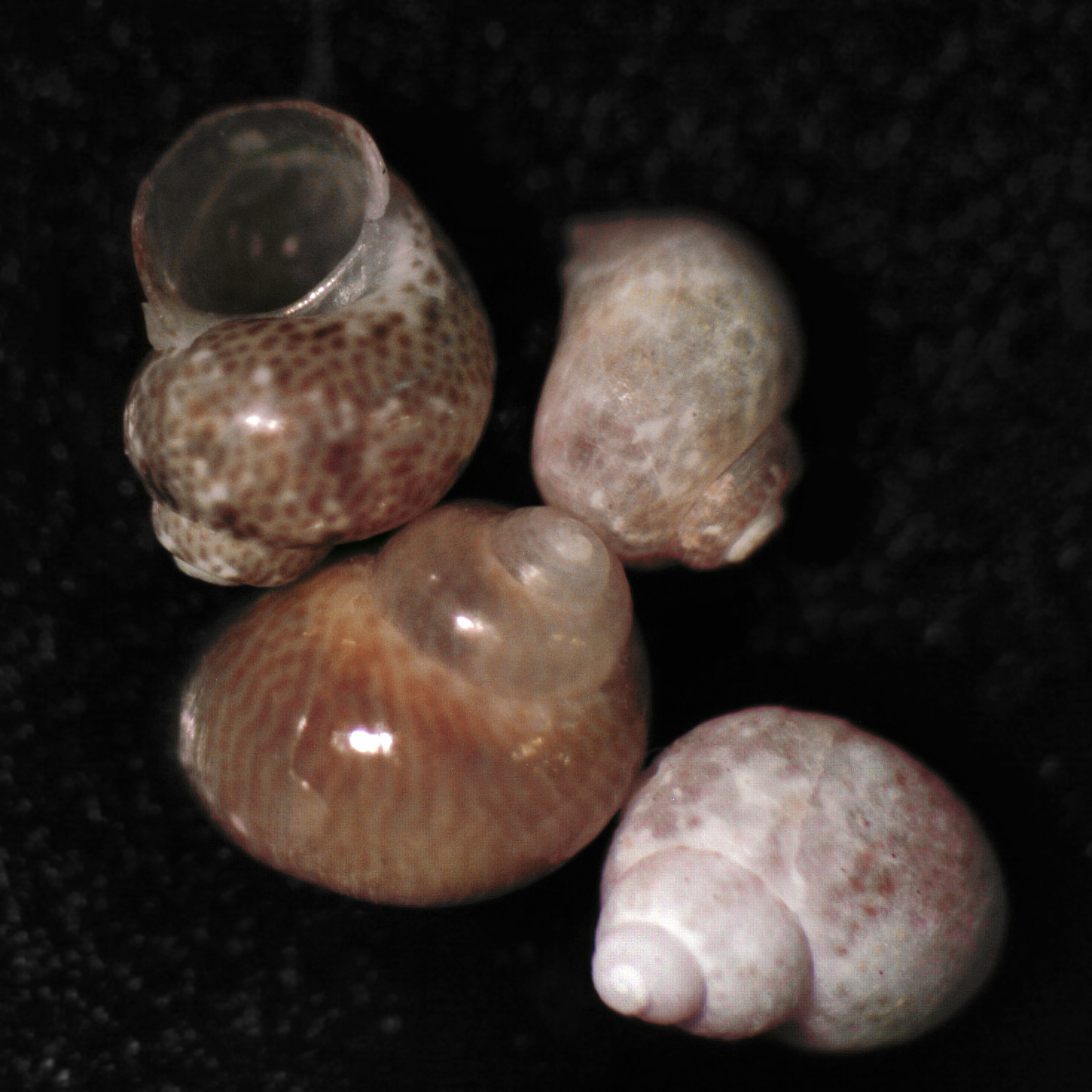
- Several shells of Eulithidium thalassicola

Scientific classification
- Kingdom: Animalia
- Phylum: Mollusca
- Class: Gastropoda
- Subclass: Vetigastropoda
- Order: Trochida
- Family: Phasianellidae
- Genus: Eulithidium
- Species: E. thalassicola

Binomial name
- Eulithidium thalassicola (Robertson, 1958)

Synonyms
- Tricolia tesselata auct. non C. B. Adams, 1850; Tricolia thalassicola Robertson, 1958 (original combination); Turbo umbilicatus d'Orbigny, 1842

= Eulithidium thalassicola =

Species of gastropod

Eulithidium thalassicola, common name the turtle grass pheasant shell, is a species of sea snail, a marine gastropod mollusc in the family Phasianellidae.

== Description ==
The height of the shell varies between 2 mm and 7.1 mm.

== Distribution ==
This species occurs in the Gulf of Mexico, the Caribbean Sea and the Lesser Antilles; in the Western Atlantic Ocean from North Carolina to Brazil.
