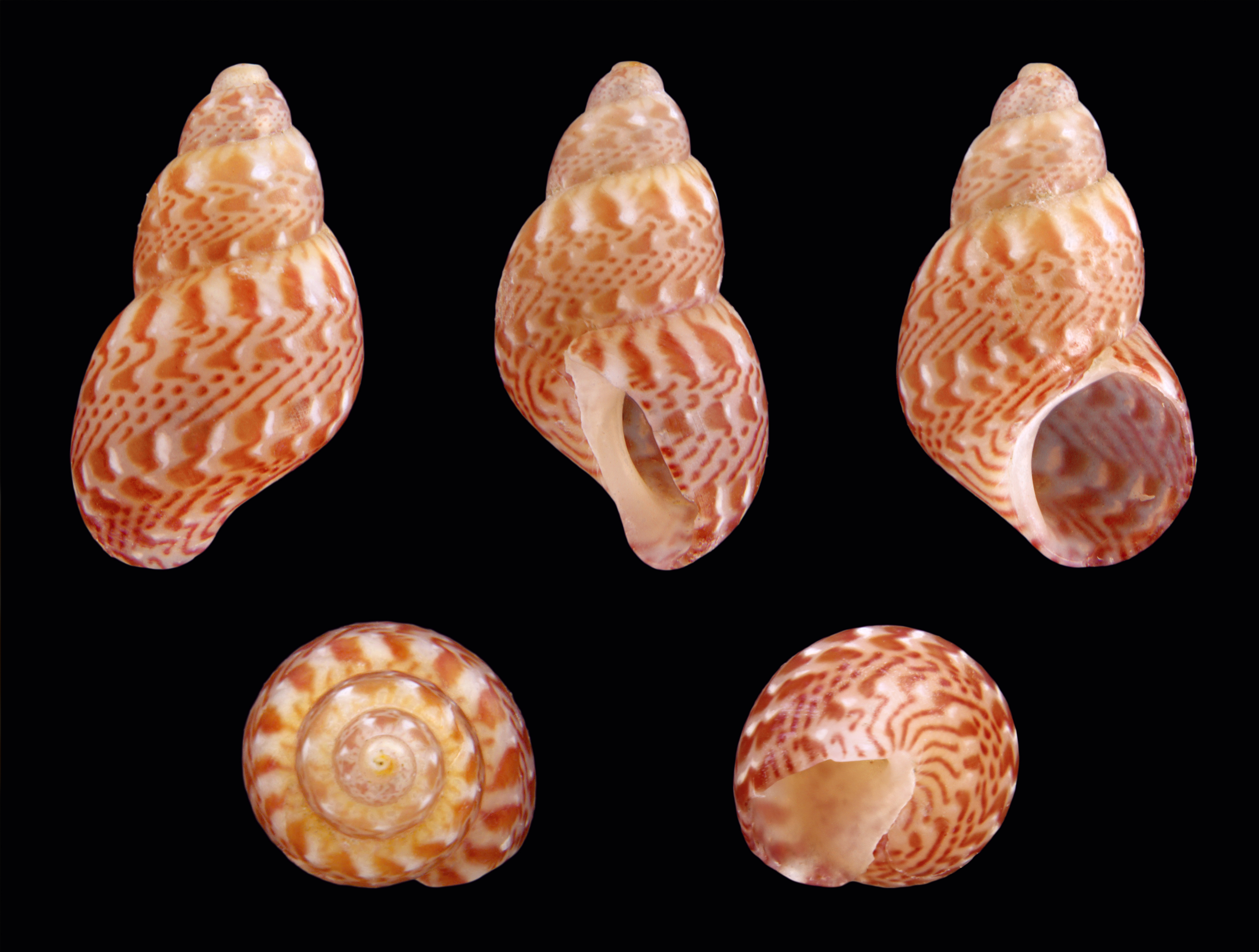
- Tricolia pullus

Scientific classification
- Kingdom: Animalia
- Phylum: Mollusca
- Class: Gastropoda
- Subclass: Vetigastropoda
- Order: Trochida
- Family: Phasianellidae
- Genus: Tricolia
- Species: T. pullus

Binomial name
- Tricolia pullus (Linnaeus, 1758)

Synonyms
- Phasianella pullus (Linnaeus, 1758); Tricolia tricolor (Monterosato in Bucquoy, Dautzenberg & Dollfus, 1884); Turbo pullus Linnaeus, 1758

= Tricolia pullus =

Species of gastropod

Tricolia pullus is a species of small sea snail, a marine gastropod mollusk in the family Phasianellidae.

== Subspecies ==
Subspecies within this species are not clearly distinguishable and are described on a geographical base. They include:

- Tricolia pullus azorica (Dautzenberg, 1889)
- Tricolia pullus canarica Nordsieck, 1973
- Tricolia pullus picta (da Costa, 1778) (synonyms: Phasianella pullus picta (da Costa, 1778); Tricolia picta (da Costa, 1778) )
- Tricolia pullus pullus (Linnaeus, 1758) (synonym: Turbo pullus pullus Linnaeus, 1758)
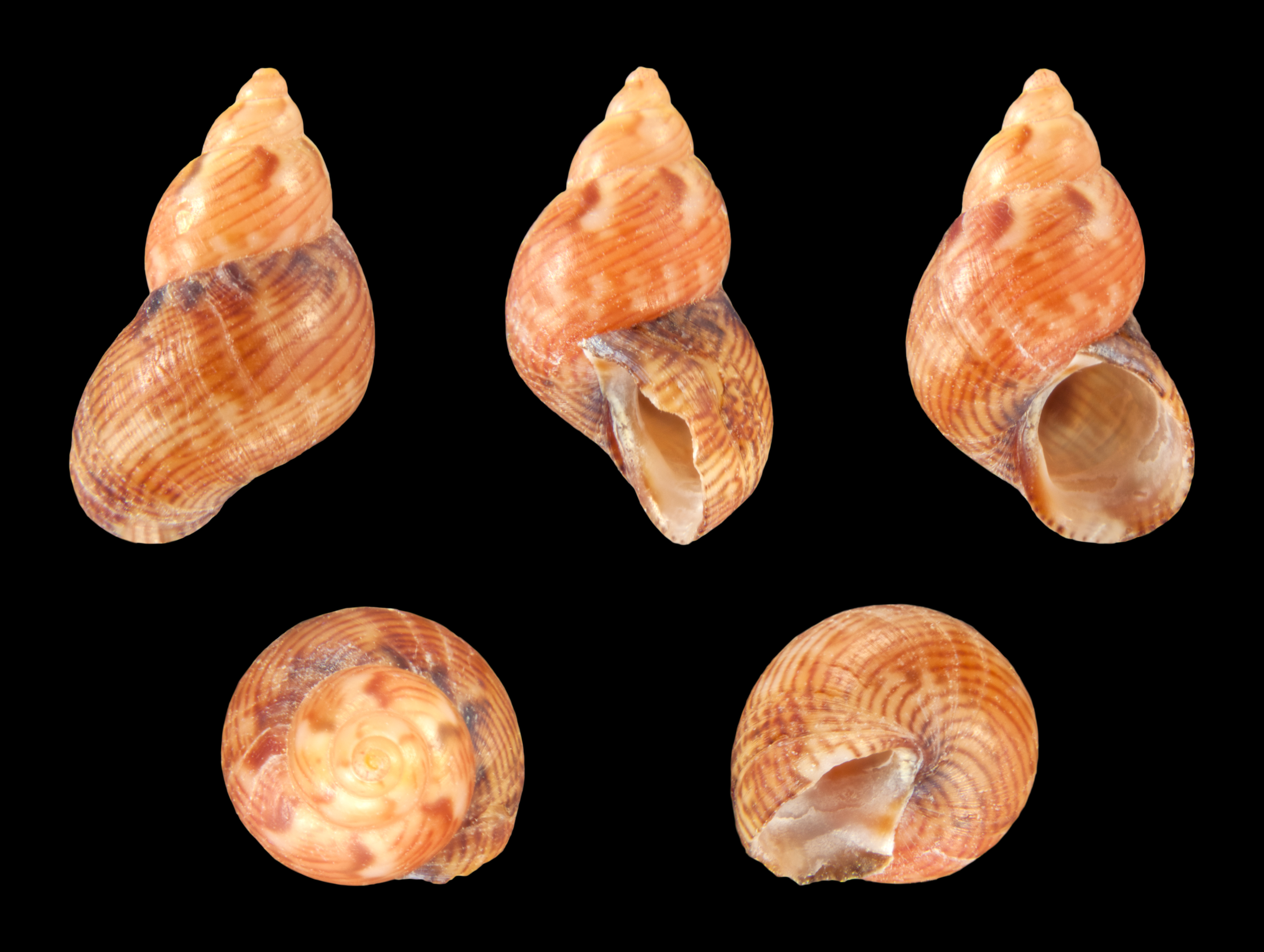
Tricolia pullus canarica

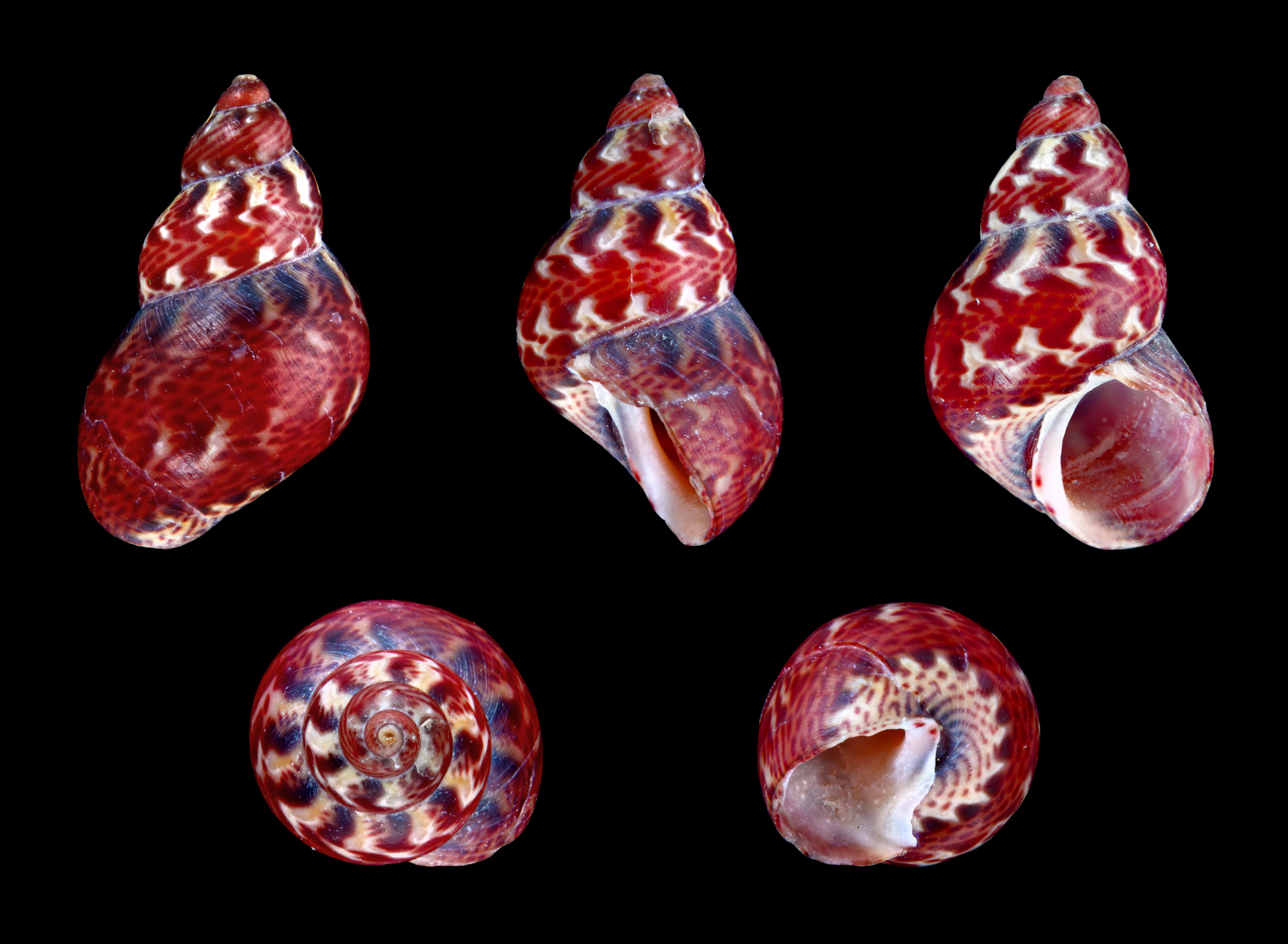
Tricolia pullus picta

== Description ==
The size of the plump, oval shell varies between 3 mm and 11 mm. The shell has five or six rounded, gently convex whorls with a smooth structure, the body whorl being the largest. The shell has a short, abrupt spire. There is no distinct umbilicus. The aperture is roundish oval with a conspicuous operculum is thick and has a white calcareous surface. The colour pattern of the shiny shell is very variable and goes from cream to white with pink or purple-brown spots spirally distributed in zigzag or flamed patterns.

The adults are gonochoristic, i.e. consisting of distinct males and females. The ova are released in the sea and fertilized externally.

== Distribution ==
This species is distributed in European waters, the Mediterranean Sea, the Sea of Azov, in the Atlantic Ocean along the Canaries and in the Indian Ocean along Madagascar. It is found in the sublittoral zone and deeper waters (up to 35 m) in often abundant numbers on red seaweeds (Laurencia, Lomentaria, Mastocarpus), collecting diatoms and detritus.
