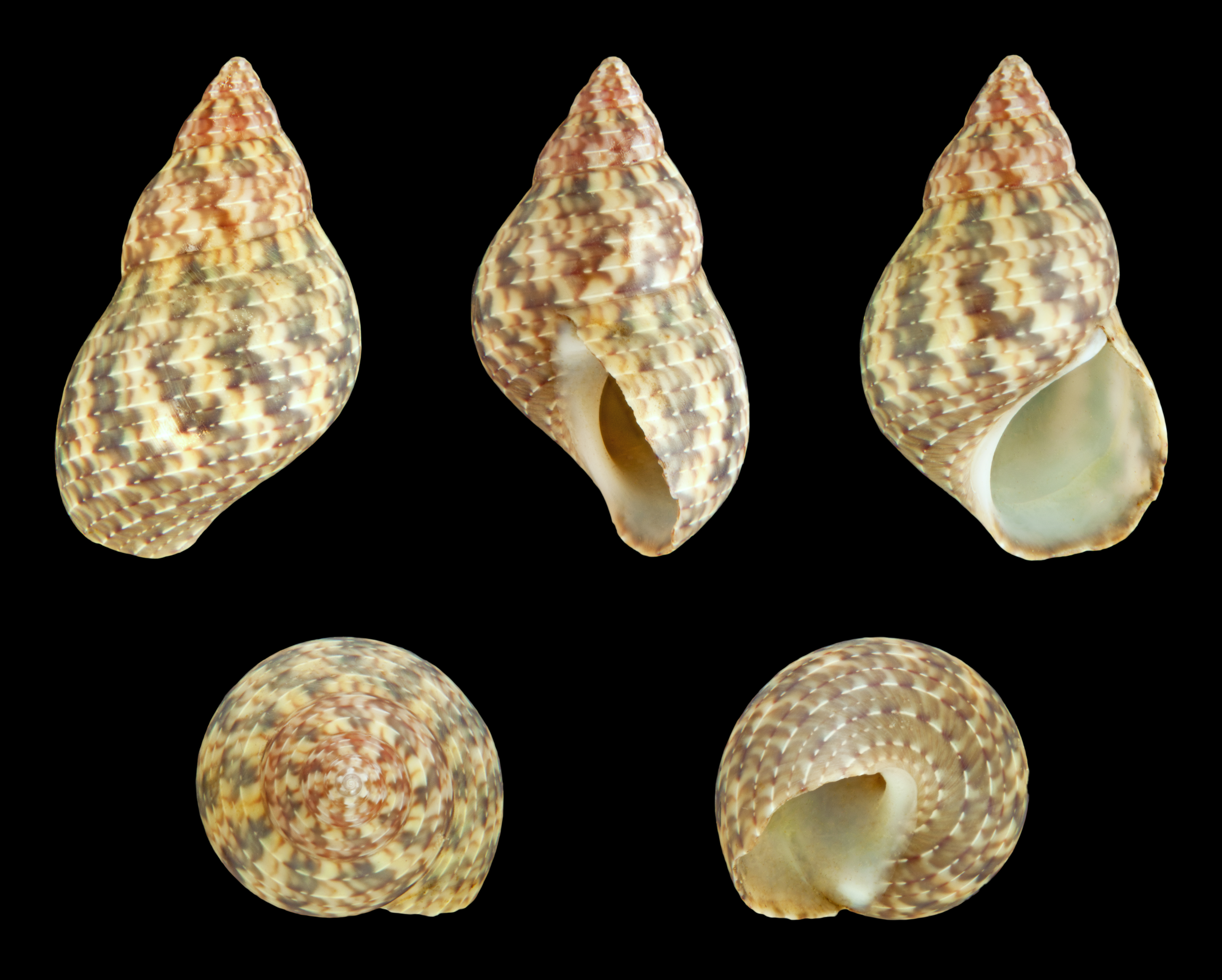
- Phasianella variegata

Scientific classification
- Kingdom: Animalia
- Phylum: Mollusca
- Class: Gastropoda
- Subclass: Vetigastropoda
- Order: Trochida
- Superfamily: Trochoidea
- Family: Phasianellidae; Swainson, 1840

= Phasianellidae =

Family of gastropods

Phasianellidae, with the common name "pheasant shells" or "pheasant snails", is a family of small sea snails with calcareous opercula, marine gastropod mollusks in the subclass Vetigastropoda.

== Taxonomy ==
The family Phasianellidae consists of three subfamilies:

- Gabrieloninae Hickman & J.H. McLean, 1990
  - Gabrielona Iredale, 1917 - type genus of the subfamily Gabrieloninae
- Phasianellinae Swainson, 1840 - synonym: Eutropiinae Gray, 1871
  - Mimelenchus Iredale, 1924
  - Orthomesus Pilsbry, 1888
  - Phasianella Lamarck, 1804
- Tricoliinae Woodring, 1928
  - Tricolia Risso, 1826 - type genus of the subfamily Tricoliinae

Additionally there are two additional genera not placed in any subfamily:

- Eulithidium Pilsbry, 1898
- Hiloa Pilsbry, 1917
