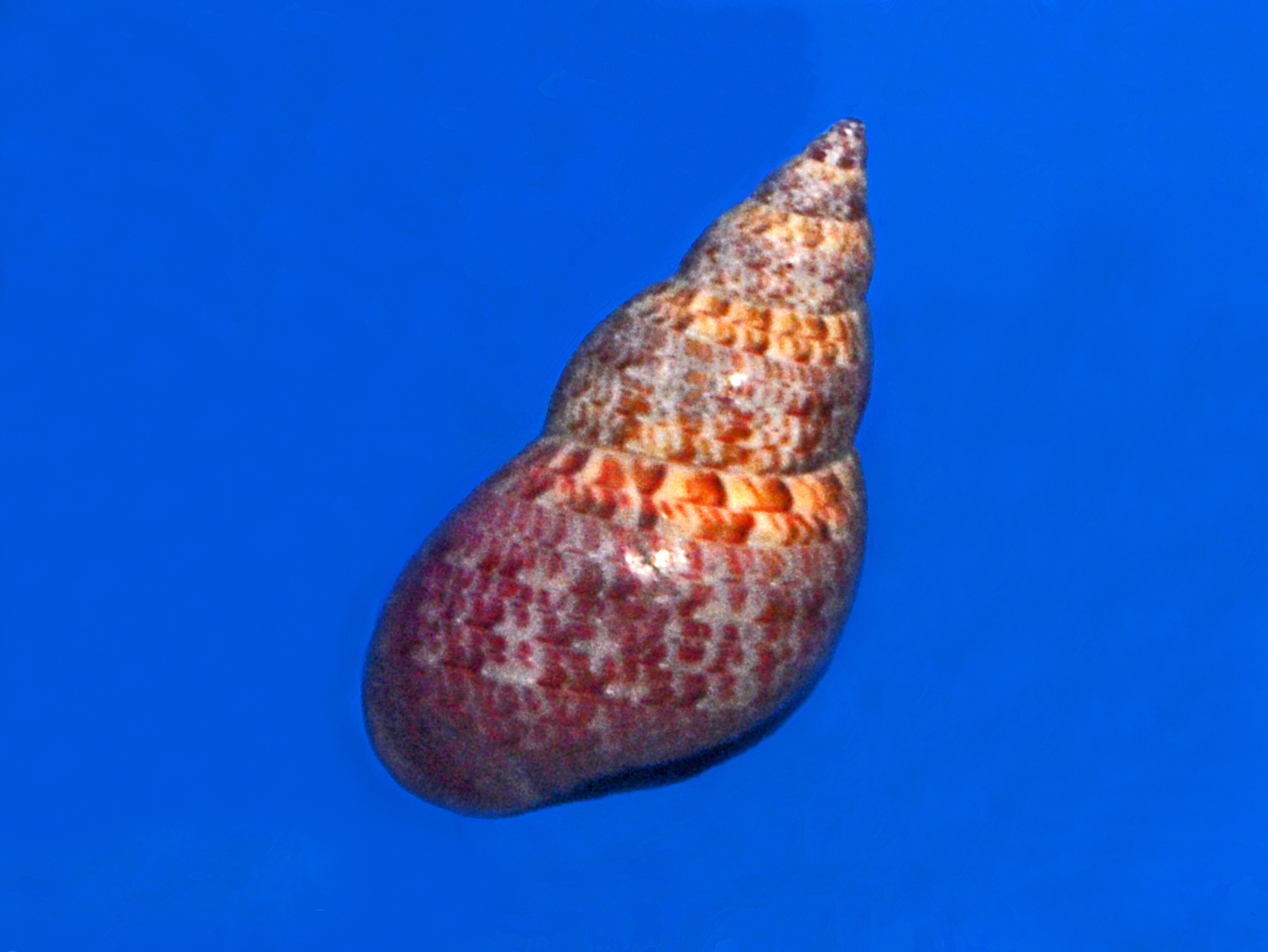
- A shell of Phasianella solida on display at the Museo Civico di Storia Naturale di Milano

Scientific classification
- Kingdom: Animalia
- Phylum: Mollusca
- Class: Gastropoda
- Subclass: Vetigastropoda
- Order: Trochida
- Family: Phasianellidae
- Subfamily: Phasianellinae
- Genus: Phasianella; Lamarck, 1804

Type species
- Phasianella australis Gmelin, J.F., 1791

Synonyms
- Bolina Rafinesque, 1815; Eutropia Gray, 1847; Orthopnoea Gistl, 1848; Pasianella Gregorio, 1922; Phaisianella King & Ping, 1933; Thasianella Tolmer, 1928

= Phasianella =

Phasianella Temporal range: Badenian-Recent

Genus of gastropods

Phasianella, common name the pheasant shells, is a genus of small sea snails with a calcareous operculum and a colorfully patterned shell, a marine gastropod mollusc in the family Phasianellidae.

== Description ==
The white shell has a bulimiform or subglobose shape. It is polished, without epidermis or nacre, variegated with bright colors. The heavy operculum is calcareous, internally paucispiral, with a nucleus near the basal margin. It is externally convex. The columella is smooth, arcuate and not dentate.

The animal has long tentacles, and has usually pectinated head lobes. These frontal lobes distinguish this genus from Tricolia, which lacks frontal lobes. The epipodial line contains generally cirrhi. The branchial plume is long. The narrow foot is long, pointed posteriorly, rounded before. Below it is divided longitudinally by a median groove. The rhomboidal jaws are covered with imbricating scales. The radula is rather short. The formula of teeth is typically ∞ 5.1.5 ∞, but sometimes lacks the median and outer lateral teeth. Contrary to most spiral species, the two gills in Phasiannela are close together, so as to appear almost as one.

== Distribution ==
The species in this genus occur in the tropical Indo-West Pacific and off Australia.

== Species ==
Species within the genus Phasianella include:

- Phasianella australis (Gmelin, 1791)
- † Phasianella brandenburgi O. Boettger, 1907
- Phasianella bryani Pilsbry, 1917
- Phasianella molokaiensis Pilsbry, 1917 (taxon inquirendum)
- Phasianella nivosa Reeve, 1862
- Phasianella solida (Born, 1778)
- Phasianella ventricosa Swainson, 1822
- Phasianella wisemanni Baird, 1873 (taxon inquirendum)

Species brought into synonymy

- Phasianella adamsi Philippi, 1853: synonym of Eulithidium adamsi (Philippi, 1853)
- Phasianella aethiopica Philippi, 1853: synonym of Phasianella solida (Born, 1778)
- Phasianella affinis C. B. Adams, 1850: synonym of Eulithidium affine (C. B. Adams, 1850)
- Phasianella africana Bartsch, 1915: synonym of Tricolia africana (Bartsch, 1915)
- Phasianella angulifera Lamarck, 1822: synonym of Littoraria angulifera (Lamarck, 1822)
- Phasianella bella M. Smith, 1937: synonym of Eulithidium bellum (M. Smith, 1937)
- Phasianella bifasciata Brown, 1827: synonym of Lacuna vincta (Montagu, 1803)
- Phasianella brevis C. B. Adams, 1850: synonym of Eulithidium adamsi (Philippi, 1853)
- Phasianella brevis Vélain, 1877: synonym of Tricolia munieri (Vélain, 1877)
- Phasianella brevis auct. non d'Orbigny, 1842: synonym of Gabrielona sulcifera Robertson, 1973
- Phasianella brevis Menke, 1843 : synonym of Phasianella ventricosa Swainson, 1822 (invalid: junior homonym of Phasianella brevis d'Orbigny, 1842; P. turgida is a replacement name)
- Phasianella brevissima Pilsbry, 1888: synonym of Eulithidium breve (d'Orbigny, 1842) [nomen dubium]
- Phasianella bulimoides Lamarck, 1822: synonym of Phasianella australis Gmelin, 1788
- Phasianella caloundra Iredale, 1927: synonym of Phasianella solida (Born, 1778)
- Phasianella canalis Montagu, 1803: synonym of Lacuna vincta (Montagu, 1803)
- Phasianella capensis Dunker, 1846: synonym of Tricolia capensis (Dunker, 1846)
- Phasianella concinna C. B. Adams, 1850 : synonym of Eulithidium affine (C. B. Adams, 1850)
- Phasianella concolor C. B. Adams, 1850: synonym of Assiminea succinea (Pfeiffer, 1840)
- Phasianella cornea Brown, 1827: synonym of Lacuna vincta (Montagu, 1803)
- Phasianella crassior Montagu, 1803: synonym of Lacuna crassior (Montagu, 1803)
- Phasianella decorata Chenu: synonym of Phasianella australis Gmelin, 1788
- Phasianella delicatula Tenison-Woods, J.E., 1877: synonym of Phasianella australis Gmelin, 1788
- Phasianella elachista Melvill, 1901: synonym of Tricolia fordiana (Pilsbry, 1888)
- Phasianella elongata Krauss, 1848: : synonym of Tricolia elongata (Krauss, 1848)
- Phasianella fasciata Menke, 1830: synonym of Bankivia fasciata (Menke, 1830)
- Phasianella ferussaci Guerin 1829 : synonym of Tricolia speciosa (Mühlfeld, 1824)
- Phasianella flammulata (Hutton, 1878): synonym of Eatoniella huttoni (Pilsbry, 1888)
- Phasianella formosa Turton, 1932: synonym of Tricolia formosa (Turton, 1932)
- Phasianella fulgurata Reeve, 1862: synonym of Phasianella variegata Lamarck, 1822
- Phasianella fulminata Menke, 1830: synonym of Bankivia fasciata (Menke, 1830)
- Phasianella grata Philippi, 1853: synonym of Phasianella solida (Born, 1778)
- Phasianella histrio Reeve, 1862: synonym of Phasianella solida (Born, 1778)
- Phasianella inflexa Blainville, 1825: synonym of Melanella dufresnii Bowdich, 1822
- Phasianella intermedia Scacchi, 1836: synonym of Tricolia tenuis (Michaud, 1829)
- Phasianella jaspidea Reeve, 1862: synonym of Phasianella solida (Born, 1778)
- Phasianella kraussi E. A. Smith, 1911: synonym of Tricolia kraussi (E. A. Smith, 1911)
- Phasianella lehmanni Menke, 1830: synonym of Phasianella australis Gmelin, 1788
- Phasianella lentiginosa Reeve: synonym of Phasianella variegata Lamarck, 1822
- Phasianella lineata Lamarck, 1822: synonym of Littoraria tessellata (Philippi, 1847)
- Phasianella lineata auct. non Lamarck, 1822: synonym of Echinolittorina interrupta (Philippi, 1847)
- Phasianella lineolata Wood, 1828: synonym of Phasianella variegata Lamarck, 1822
- Phasianella lipeata Krebs, 1864: synonym of Eulithidium tessellatum (Potiez & Michaud, 1838)
- Phasianella lymnaeoides Anton 1839: synonym of Tricolia speciosa (Mühlfeld, 1824)
- Phasianella meleagris Potiez & Michaud, 1838: synonym of Echinolittorina meleagris (Potiez & Michaud, 1838)
- Phasianella minima Melvill, 1896: synonym of Tricolia fordiana (Pilsbry, 1888)
- Phasianella minuta Anton, 1838: synonym of Eulithidium tessellatum (Potiez & Michaud, 1838)
- Phasianella modesta Gould, 1861: synonym of Phasianella solida (Born, 1778)
- Phasianella montebelloensis Preston, 1914: synonym of Phasianella variegata Lamarck, 1822
- Phasianella munieri Vélain, 1877: synonym of Tricolia munieri (Vélain, 1877)
- Phasianella nebulosa Lamarck, 1822: synonym of Littoraria nebulosa (Lamarck, 1822)
- Phasianella nepeanensis Gatliff & Gabriel, 1908: synonym of Gabrielona nepeanensis (Gatliff & Gabriel, 1908)
- Phasianella neritina Dunker, 1846: synonym of Tricolia neritina (Dunker, 1846)
- Phasianella nivosa Reeve, 1848: synonym of Phasianella variegata Lamarck, 1822
- Phasianella peruviana Lamarck, 1822: synonym of Echinolittorina peruviana (Lamarck, 1822)
- Phasianella petiti Craven, 1882: synonym of Tricolia petiti (Craven, 1882)
- Phasianella picta DeBlain: synonym of Phasianella australis Gmelin, 1788
- Phasianella preissi Menke, 1830: synonym of Phasianella australis Gmelin, 1788
- Phasianella pullus (Linnaeus, 1758): synonym of Tricolia pullus (Linnaeus, 1758)
- Phasianella punctata Pfeiffer, 1840: synonym of Echinolittorina meleagris (Potiez & Michaud, 1838)
- Phasianella reticulata Reeve, 1862: synonym of Phasianella ventricosa Swainson, 1822
- Phasianella rubens Lamarck, 1822: synonym of Phasianella variegata Lamarck, 1822
- Phasianella sanguinea Reeve, 1862: synonym of Phasianella ventricosa Swainson, 1822
- Phasianella speciosa var. albina Monterosato 1880: synonym of Tricolia speciosa (Mühlfeld, 1824)
- Phasianella speciosa var. atra Bucquoy, Dautzenberg & Dollfus 1884: synonym of Tricolia speciosa (Mühlfeld, 1824)
- Phasianella speciosa var. atrata Dautzenberg 1883: synonym of Tricolia speciosa (Mühlfeld, 1824)
- Phasianella speciosa var. aurea Dautzenberg 1882: synonym of Tricolia speciosa (Mühlfeld, 1824)
- Phasianella speciosa var. lactea Monterosato 1880: synonym of Tricolia speciosa (Mühlfeld, 1824)
- Phasianella speciosa var. maculata Monterosato 1880: synonym of Tricolia speciosa (Mühlfeld, 1824)
- Phasianella speciosa var. major Monterosato 1880: synonym of Tricolia speciosa (Mühlfeld, 1824)
- Phasianella speciosa var. normalis Monterosato 1880: synonym of Tricolia speciosa (Mühlfeld, 1824)
- Phasianella speciosa var. purpurea Dautzenberg 1883: synonym of Tricolia speciosa (Mühlfeld, 1824)
- Phasianella speciosa var. sanguinea Bucquoy, Dautzenberg & Dollfus 1884: synonym of Tricolia speciosa (Mühlfeld, 1824)
- Phasianella speciosa var. spirolineata Monterosato 1880: synonym of Tricolia speciosa (Mühlfeld, 1824)
- Phasianella speciosa var. viridis Monterosato 1880: synonym of Tricolia speciosa (Mühlfeld, 1824)
- Phasianella splendida Philippi, 1853: synonym of Phasianella variegata Lamarck, 1822
- Phasianella striata Brown, 1827: synonym of Lacuna vincta (Montagu, 1803)
- Phasianella striolata Turton, 1932: synonym of Tricolia striolata (Turton, 1932)
- Phasianella stylifera Turton, 1825: synonym of Pelseneeria stylifera (Turton, 1825)
- Phasianella sulcata Lamarck, 1822: synonym of Littoraria irrorata (Say, 1822)
- Phasianella sulcosa Mighels, 1843: synonym of Odostomia sulcosa (Mighels, 1843)
- Phasianella tessellata Potiez & Michaud, 1838: synonym of Eulithidium tessellatum (Potiez & Michaud, 1838)
- Phasianella tesselata C. B. Adams, 1850: synonym of Eulithidium tessellatum (Potiez & Michaud, 1838)
- Phasianella tessellata Anton, 1838: synonym of Echinolittorina punctata (Gmelin, 1791)
- Phasianella thaanumi Pilsbry, 1917: synonym of Hiloa variabilis (Pease, 1861)
- Phasianella tomlini Gatliff & Gabriel, 1921: synonym of Tricolia tomlini (Gatliff & Gabriel, 1921)
- Phasianella tritonis Chemnitz, 1788: synonym of Phasianella australis (Gmelin, 1791)
- Phasianella turgida Philippi, 1853 : synonym of Phasianella ventricosa Swainson, 1822
- Phasianella undatella Menke, 1830: synonym of Bankivia fasciata (Menke, 1830)
- Phasianella variabilis Pease, 1888: synonym of Hiloa variabilis (Pease, 1861) (unaccepted combination)
- Phasianella variegata Lamarck, 1822: synonym of Phasianella solida (Born, 1778) (invalid: junior homonym of P. variegata de Roissy, 1805)
- Phasianella velaini Lamy, 1931: synonym of Tricolia munieri (Vélain, 1877)
- Phasianella umbilicatum auct. non d'Orbigny, 1842: synonym of Eulithidium affine (C. B. Adams, 1850)
- Phasianella varia Lamarck, 1822: : synonym of Phasianella australis Gmelin, 1788
- Phasianella venosa Reeve, 1862: synonym of Phasianella ventricosaSwainson, 1822
- Phasianella venusta Reeve, 1848: synonym of Phasianella australis (Gmelin, 1791)
- Phasianella vincta Montagu, 1803: synonym of Lacuna vincta (Montagu, 1803)
- Phasianella viridis Anton: synonym of Phasianella variegata Lamarck, 1822
- Phasianella zebra Gray in Reeve, 1862: synonym of Phasianella ventricosaSwainson, 1822
- Phasianella zigzag Odhner, 1919: : synonym of Phasianella solida (Born, 1778)
