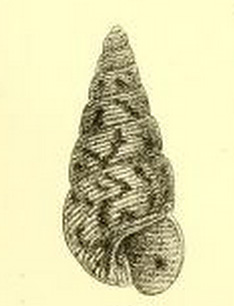
- Leiopyrga octona shell

Scientific classification
- Kingdom: Animalia
- Phylum: Mollusca
- Class: Gastropoda
- Subclass: Vetigastropoda
- Order: Trochida
- Superfamily: Trochoidea
- Family: Trochidae
- Genus: Leiopyrga; H. Adams & A. Adams, 1863

Type species
- Leiopyrga lineolaris Gould, A.A., 1861

= Leiopyrga =

Genus of gastropods

Leiopyrga is a genus of sea snails, marine gastropod mollusks in the family Trochidae, the top snails.

== Description ==
The thin, perforate, elongated, narrow shell is somewhat turreted. The whorls are convex, rounded or carinated. The oval aperture is small. The columella is arcuate, not truncated at its base. This genus differs from Bankivia by its umbilicus.

== Species ==
- Leiopyrga cingulata Adams, 1864
- Leiopyrga lineolaris Gould, A.A., 1861
- Leiopyrga octona Tate, 1891

Species brought into synonymy

- Leiopyrga picturata H. & A. Adams, 1863: synonym of Leiopyrga lineolaris Gould, A.A., 1861
