= Eulithidium substriatum =

Scientific classification
- Kingdom: Animalia
- Phylum: Mollusca
- Class: Gastropoda
- Subclass: Vetigastropoda
- Order: Trochida
- Family: Phasianellidae
- Subfamily: Tricoliinae
- Genus: Eulithidium
- Species: E. substriatum

Binomial name
- Eulithidium substriatum (Carpenter, 1864)

Synonyms
- Eucosmia variegata substriata P. P. Carpenter, 1864; Phasianella variegata var. substriata Carpenter, 1864; Tricolia substriata (P. P. Carpenter, 1864)

Species of gastropod

Eulithidium substriatum is a species of small sea snail with calcareous opercula, a marine gastropod mollusk in the family Phasianellidae, the pheasant snails.

== Description ==
(Description as Tricolia substriata) The form of the shell is as in Phasianella variegata Lamarck, 1822 but the whorls, except the nuclear whorl, are very delicately striate, the body whorl with about ten striae.

== Distribution ==
This species occurs in the Pacific Ocean from Lower California to Panama.
