= Eulithidium diantha =

Scientific classification
- Kingdom: Animalia
- Phylum: Mollusca
- Class: Gastropoda
- Subclass: Vetigastropoda
- Order: Trochida
- Superfamily: Trochoidea
- Family: Phasianellidae
- Subfamily: Tricoliinae
- Genus: Eulithidium
- Species: E. diantha

Binomial name
- Eulithidium diantha (McLean, 1970)

Synonyms
- Tricolia diantha McLean, J.H., 1970

Species of gastropod

Eulithidium diantha is a species of small sea snail with a calcareous opercula, a marine gastropod mollusk in the family Phasianellidae, the pheasant snails.

== Description ==
The length of the shell varies between 1.7 mm and 2.1 mm.

== Distribution ==
This marine species occurs off the Galápagos Islands, off Cocos Island and off Costa Rica.
