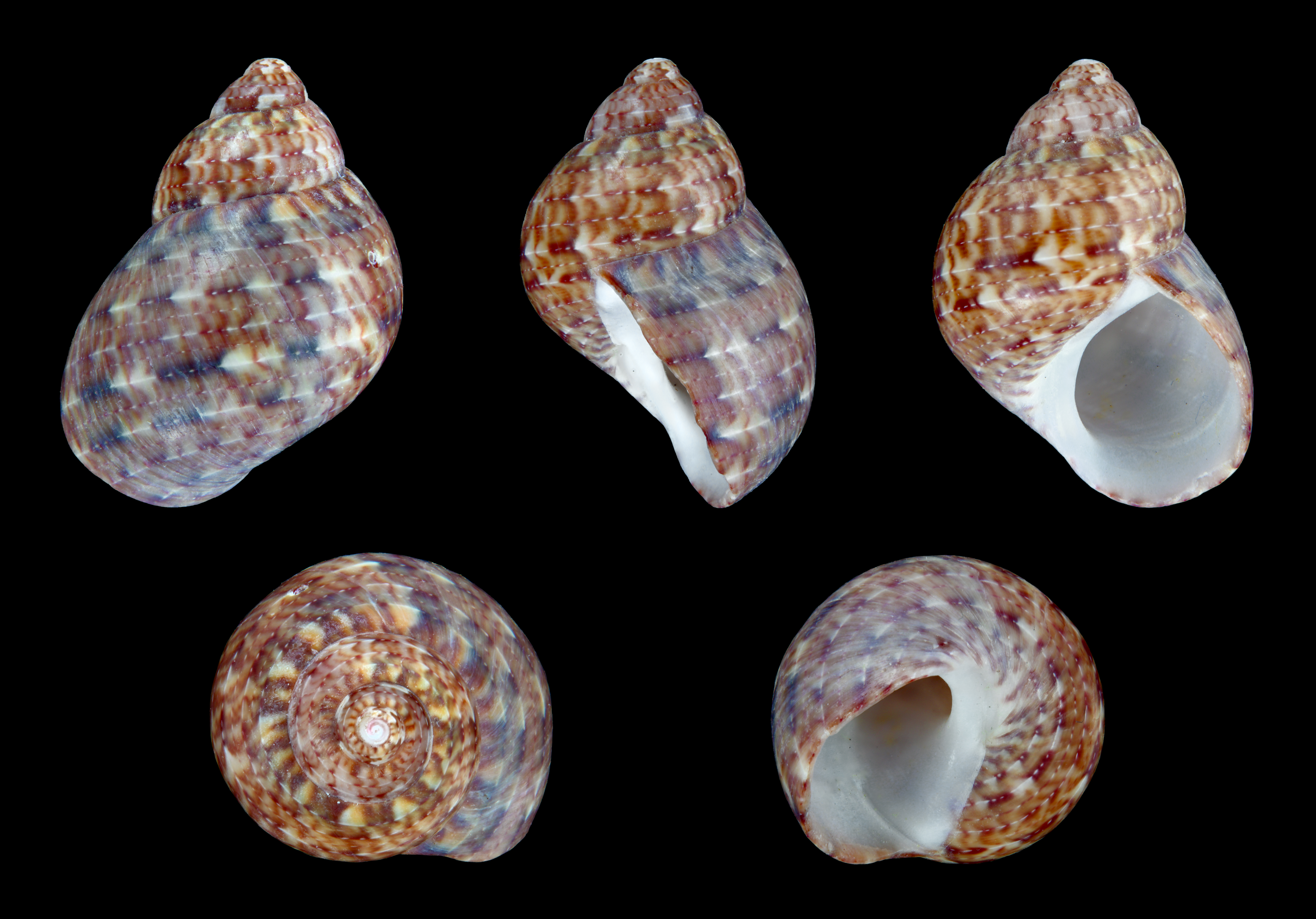

Scientific classification
- Kingdom: Animalia
- Phylum: Mollusca
- Class: Gastropoda
- Subclass: Vetigastropoda
- Order: Trochida
- Family: Phasianellidae
- Genus: Phasianella
- Species: P. solida

Binomial name
- Phasianella solida (Born, 1778)

Synonyms
- Eutropia modesta A. Gould, 1861; Helix solida Born, 1778 (original combination); Phasianella aethiopica Philippi, 1853; Phasianella caloundra Iredale, 1927; Phasianella grata Philippi, 1853; Phasianella histrio Reeve, 1862; Phasianella jaspidea Reeve, 1862; Phasianella modesta Gould, 1861; Phasianella montebelloensis Preston, 1914; Phasianella rubens Lamarck, 1822; Phasianella splendida Philippi, 1849 (junior synonym); Phasianella variegata Lamarck, 1822 (invalid: junior homonym of P. variegata de Roissy, 1805); Phasianella zigzag Odhner, 1919; Tricolia brongniartii Audouin, 1826; Tricolia guerini Audouin, 1826; Turbo (Phasianella) lineolatus W. Wood, 1828

= Phasianella solida =

Species of gastropod

Phasianella solida, common name the solid pheasant, is a species of sea snail, a marine gastropod mollusk in the family Phasianellidae.

== Description ==
The size of the shell varies between 8 mm and 32 mm. Protoconch is smooth and the shell is brilliant, long, thin and turban-shaped, usually pale brown, reddish or pinkish, marked with variable blotches. It shows four-five rounded whorls. The operculum is white, oval-shaped.

(Description of Phasianella aethiopica) The height of the shell varies between 12 mm and 35 mm. The thick, solid shell has a pointed-ovate shape. The 5–6 whorls are moderately convex, sloping below the sutures. The oblique, ovate aperture is about half the length of shell. The thickened columella has a heavy white or rosy callus, and is subdentate near the posterior angle of the aperture. The color of the shell is light brown or rose, with revolving series of arrow-shapeci or irregular flecks of lighter shade, or with longitudinal oblique light stripes extending downward to middle of body whorl. The apex and the base of the shell are stained with rose color.

(Description of Phasianella variegata Lamarck, 1822) The solid shell grows to a height of 2 cm and has an ovate-conic shape. Its pointed, conic spire is higher and more acute than the spire of Phasianella nivosa. The five, somewhat convex whorls are separated by well marked sutures and are somewhat flattened above. The rather small aperture is short ovate, and measures less than half the length of the shell. It is widely rounded below, and angular above. The columella has a flattened callus. The parietal wall has a more or less white callus, and is decidedly thickened near the posterior angle. The color of the shell is variable, often pale with reddish-brown and white dashes and blotches. It is usually flesh tinted, ashen or brown, more or less clouded with darker and lighter shades, and flammulated with dark and light below the sutures, spirally traversed by narrow hair-like lines of brown or red, interrupted by white dots and intervals. The white is sometimes predominate.

== Distribution ==
This quite common species occurs in the Red Sea, in the Indian Ocean off Madagascar, Tanzania and the Mascarene Basin; off the Aldabra Atoll;in the tropical Indo-West Pacific: off southern Australia, the Philippines, off Java and Japan. It lives at intertidal depths up to 15 m.
