= Eulithidium cyclostoma =

Scientific classification
- Kingdom: Animalia
- Phylum: Mollusca
- Class: Gastropoda
- Subclass: Vetigastropoda
- Order: Trochida
- Superfamily: Trochoidea
- Family: Phasianellidae
- Subfamily: Tricoliinae
- Genus: Eulithidium
- Species: E. cyclostoma

Binomial name
- Eulithidium cyclostoma (Carpenter, 1864)

Synonyms
- Eucosmia cyclostoma Carpenter, 1864; Phasianella (Eucosmia) cyclostoma Carpenter, Pilsbry 1888; Tricolia cyclostoma (Carpenter, 1864)

Species of gastropod

Eulithidium cyclostoma is a species of small sea snail with calcareous opercula, a marine gastropod mollusk in the family Phasianellidae, the pheasant snails.

== Description ==
The height of the dark brownish shell reaches 2 mm. The broad, very obtuse shell consists of three whorls. These are rounded, and slightly shouldered. The shell is densely pointed or stained. The large umbilicus is subspiral. The aperture is large. The sutures are very impressed.

== Distribution ==
The type locality is listed as "Cape St. Lucas, (Xantus)" (Cabo San Lucas, Baja California Sur, Mexico).
