= Eulithidium perforatum =

- Drawing with an apertural view of a shell of Eulithidium perforata

Scientific classification
- Kingdom: Animalia
- Phylum: Mollusca
- Class: Gastropoda
- Subclass: Vetigastropoda
- Order: Trochida
- Superfamily: Trochoidea
- Family: Phasianellidae
- Subfamily: Tricoliinae
- Genus: Eulithidium
- Species: E. perforata

Binomial name
- Eulithidium perforata (Philippi, 1848)

Synonyms
- Tricolia perforata (Philippi, 1848)

Species of gastropod

Eulithidium perforata is a species of small sea snail with calcareous opercula, a marine gastropod mollusk in the family Phasianellidae, the pheasant snails.

== Description ==
The white shell has an oblong-conoid shape. Its height reaches 3.5 mm. It is perforate, and subtessellated with oblique purple lines. It has parallel diagonal lines of red and brown. The five whorls are deeply convex, while the body whorl is subangulate. The first whorl of the five is discoidal. It is characterized by extremely minute wrinkling over the whole surface, only discernible under the microscope when quite fresh. The umbilicus is very large when young, and sharply keeled; when adult it is often nearly filled up by the callous lip. The suture and the periphery are ornamented with large maculations of white and purple. The ovate aperture is oblong and equal to the spire. The operculum is radiately wrinkled over a large part of the outer surface.

== Distribution ==
This species occurs in the Pacific Ocean off Panama.
