= Gabrielona roni =

Scientific classification
- Kingdom: Animalia
- Phylum: Mollusca
- Class: Gastropoda
- Subclass: Vetigastropoda
- Order: Trochida
- Superfamily: Trochoidea
- Family: Phasianellidae
- Subfamily: Gabrieloninae
- Genus: Gabrielona
- Species: G. roni

Binomial name
- Gabrielona roni Moolenbeek & Dekker, 1993

Species of gastropod

Gabrielona roni is a species of small sea snail with calcareous opercula, a marine gastropod mollusk in the family Phasianellidae, the pheasant snails.

== Distribution ==
This marine species occurs off Oman.
