= Eulithidium umbilicatum =

Scientific classification
- Kingdom: Animalia
- Phylum: Mollusca
- Class: Gastropoda
- Subclass: Vetigastropoda
- Order: Trochida
- Superfamily: Trochoidea
- Family: Phasianellidae
- Subfamily: Tricoliinae
- Genus: Eulithidium
- Species: E. umbilicatum

Binomial name
- Eulithidium umbilicatum (d'Orbigny, 1840)

Synonyms
- Tricolia umbilicata (d'Orbigny, 1840)

Species of gastropod

Eulithidium umbilicatum is a species of small sea snail with calcareous opercula, a marine gastropod mollusk in the family Phasianellidae, the pheasant snails.

== Distribution ==
This species occurs in the Pacific Ocean off Peru and Chile.
