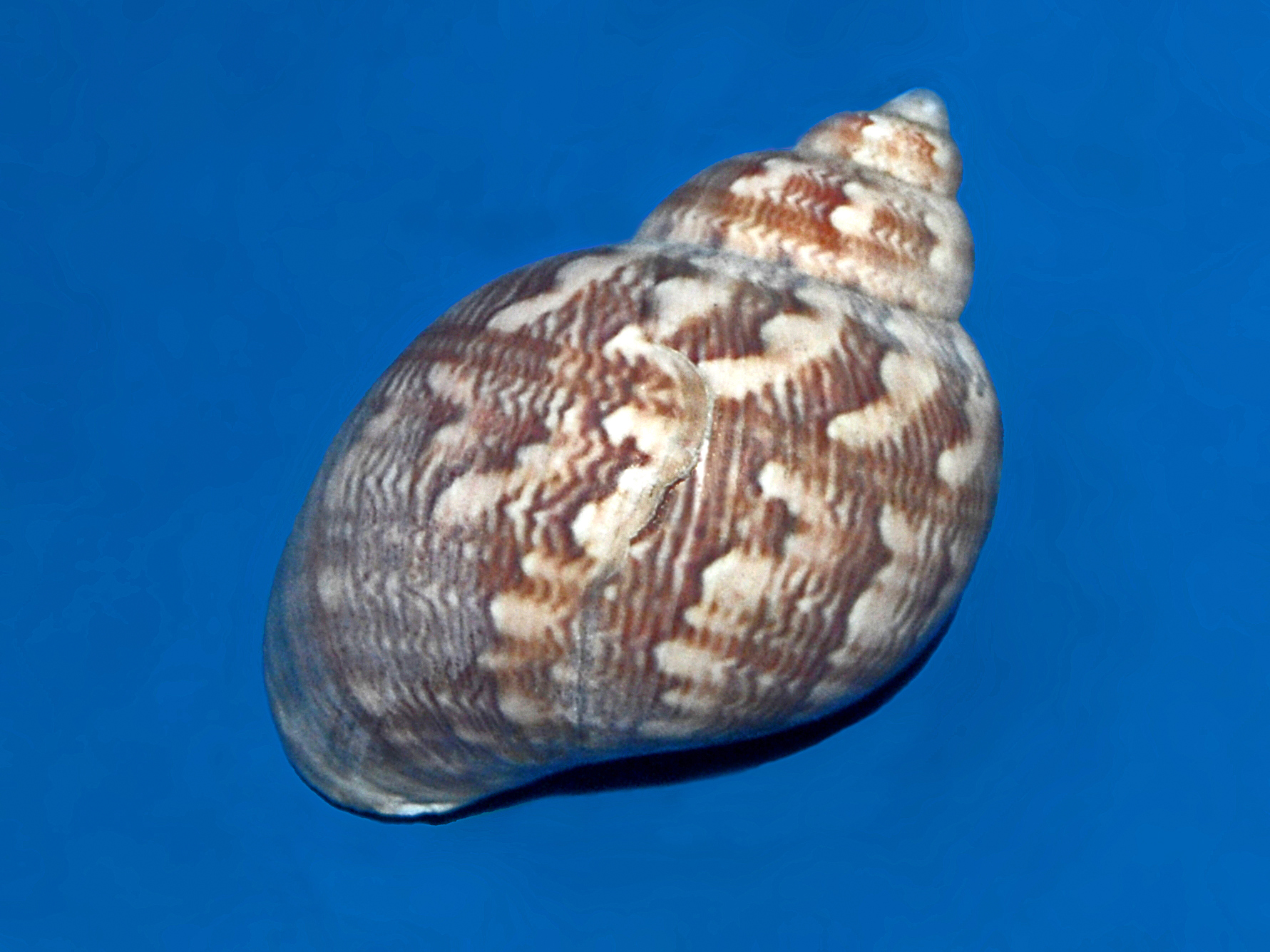
- A shell of Phasianella ventricosa from Australia on display at the Museo Civico di Storia Naturale di Milano

Scientific classification
- Kingdom: Animalia
- Phylum: Mollusca
- Class: Gastropoda
- Subclass: Vetigastropoda
- Order: Trochida
- Family: Phasianellidae
- Subfamily: Phasianellinae
- Genus: Phasianella
- Species: P. entricosa

Binomial name
- Phasianella entricosa W. A. Swainson, 1822

Synonyms
- Phasianella brevis Menke, 1843 (invalid: junior homonym of Phasianella brevis d'Orbigny, 1842; P. turgida is a replacement name); Phasianella perdix (W. Wood, 1828); Phasianella peroni Mabille, 1888; Phasianella reticulata Reeve, 1862; Phasianella sanguinea Reeve, 1862; Phasianella turgida Philippi, 1853; Phasianella venosa Reeve, 1862; Phasianella zebra Reeve, 1862; Turbo perdix W. Wood, 1828

= Phasianella ventricosa =

Species of gastropod

Phasianella ventricosa, common name the swollen pheasant shell or common pheasant shell, is a species of sea snail, a marine gastropod mollusk in the family Phasianellidae.

== Description ==
The shell of an adult Phasianella ventricosa can be as long as 20–45 millimetres (0.79–1.77 in). It is a medium weight shell, with rounded whorls. The surface is smooth and glossy. The basic coloration is brick-red with fawn or cream axial streaks and alternating brown and white spiral lines.

== Distribution ==
This species is endemic to Australia, from New South Wales to Western Australia and Tasmania. It lives on kelp and under rocks on reefs at depths of about 10 m.
