= Gabrielona =

Scientific classification
- Kingdom: Animalia
- Phylum: Mollusca
- Class: Gastropoda
- Subclass: Vetigastropoda
- Order: Trochida
- Family: Phasianellidae
- Subfamily: Gabrieloninae
- Genus: Gabrielona; Iredale, 1917

Type species
- Phasianella nepeanensis Gatliff & Gabriel, 1908

Genus of gastropods

Gabrielona is a genus of sea snails, marine gastropod mollusks in the family Phasianellidae.

== Species ==
Species within the genus Gabrielona include:

- Gabrielona hadra (Woodring, 1928)
- Gabrielona nepeanensis (Gatliff & Gabriel, 1908)
- Gabrielona pisinna Robertson, 1973
- Gabrielona raunana Ladd, 1966
- Gabrielona roni Moolenbeek & Dekker, 1993
- Gabrielona sulcifera Robertson, 1973
