= Eulithidium rubrilineatum =

Scientific classification
- Kingdom: Animalia
- Phylum: Mollusca
- Class: Gastropoda
- Subclass: Vetigastropoda
- Order: Trochida
- Superfamily: Trochoidea
- Family: Phasianellidae
- Subfamily: Tricoliinae
- Genus: Eulithidium
- Species: E. rubrilineatum

Binomial name
- Eulithidium rubrilineatum (Strong, 1928)

Species of gastropod

Eulithidium rubrilineatum, common name the red line pheasant, is an extremely small species of sea snail with a calcareous opercula, a marine gastropod mollusk in the family Phasianellidae, the pheasant snails.

== Description ==
This very small shell grows to a height of 1.6 mm. The shell has a depressed turbinate shape. It contains 4-5 whorls. The umbilicus is only a small depression. The calcareous operculum has a white color. The shell shows about a dozen red, oblique spiral lines. The shoulders of the whorls are red with large white spots.

== Distribution ==
This species occurs in the Pacific Ocean off California.
