= Eulithidium phasianella =

Scientific classification
- Kingdom: Animalia
- Phylum: Mollusca
- Class: Gastropoda
- Subclass: Vetigastropoda
- Order: Trochida
- Superfamily: Trochoidea
- Family: Phasianellidae
- Subfamily: Tricoliinae
- Genus: Eulithidium
- Species: E. phasianella

Binomial name
- Eulithidium phasianella (Philippi, 1849)

Synonyms
- Tricolia phasianella (Philippi, R.A., 1849)

Species of gastropod

Eulithidium phasianella is a species of small sea snail with calcareous opercula, a marine gastropod mollusk in the family Phasianellidae, the pheasant snails.

== Description ==
The shell grows to a height of 4 mm.

== Distribution ==
This species occurs in the Pacific Ocean from Nicaragua to Peru, but not off Galapagos Islands.
