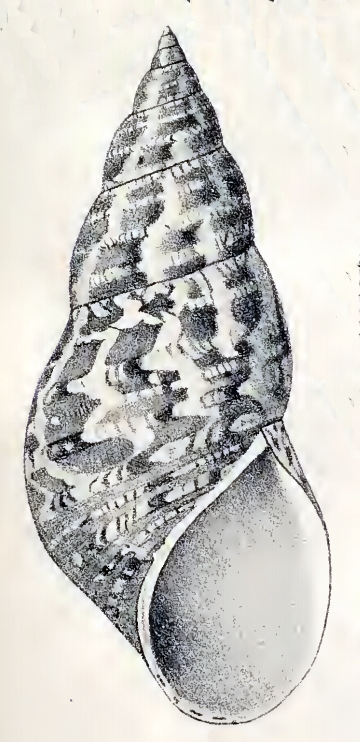
- Drawing of a shell of Phasianella australis

Scientific classification
- Kingdom: Animalia
- Phylum: Mollusca
- Class: Gastropoda
- Subclass: Vetigastropoda
- Order: Trochida
- Superfamily: Trochoidea
- Family: Phasianellidae
- Genus: Phasianella
- Species: P. australis

Binomial name
- Phasianella australis Gmelin, 1788

Synonyms
- Buccinum tritonis Chemnitz, 1788; Bulimus phasianus Perry, G., 1810; Phasianella bulimoides Lamarck; Phasianella decorata Chenu; Phasianella delicatula Tenison-Woods, J.E., 1877; Phasianella lehmanni Menke, 1830; Phasianella picta DeBlain; Phasianella preissi Menke, 1830; Phasianella tritonis Chemnitz, 1788; Phasianella varia Lamarck

= Phasianella australis =

Australian Pheasant

Species of gastropod

Phasianella australis, common names the Australian pheasant, painted lady, and pheasant snail, is a medium-sized to large species of sea snail with a calcareous operculum and a colorfully patterned shell, a marine gastropod mollusc in the family Phasianellidae.

== Description ==
This is the largest shell in the genus Phasianella, with its height varying between 40 mm and 100 mm. The rather thin shell is elongated and has a pointed-ovate shape. The conical spire is elevated. The shell contains 7-8 somewhat convex whorls. These are slightly flattened below the sutures. The long-ovate aperture is somewhat pyriform and forms usually less than half the total length of shell. The outer lip is thin. The columella shows more or less a white shining callus. The surface of the shell is variously longitudinally clouded and transversely articulated with red and purple olive on a polished flesh-colored, cream or white ground. The color pattern is extremely variable.

== Distribution ==
This marine species occurs off southern Australia and Tasmania.
