= Gabrielona pisinna =

Scientific classification
- Kingdom: Animalia
- Phylum: Mollusca
- Class: Gastropoda
- Subclass: Vetigastropoda
- Order: Trochida
- Superfamily: Trochoidea
- Family: Phasianellidae
- Subfamily: Gabrieloninae
- Genus: Gabrielona
- Species: G. pisinna

Binomial name
- Gabrielona pisinna Robertson, 1973

Species of gastropod

Gabrielona pisinna, common name the tiny pheasant, is a species of small sea snail with calcareous opercula, a marine gastropod mollusk in the family Phasianellidae, the pheasant snails.

== Description ==
The size of the shell varies between 0.34 mm and 1.1 mm.

== Distribution ==
This species occurs in the Indian Ocean off Mauritius and in the Pacific Ocean off New Caledonia.
