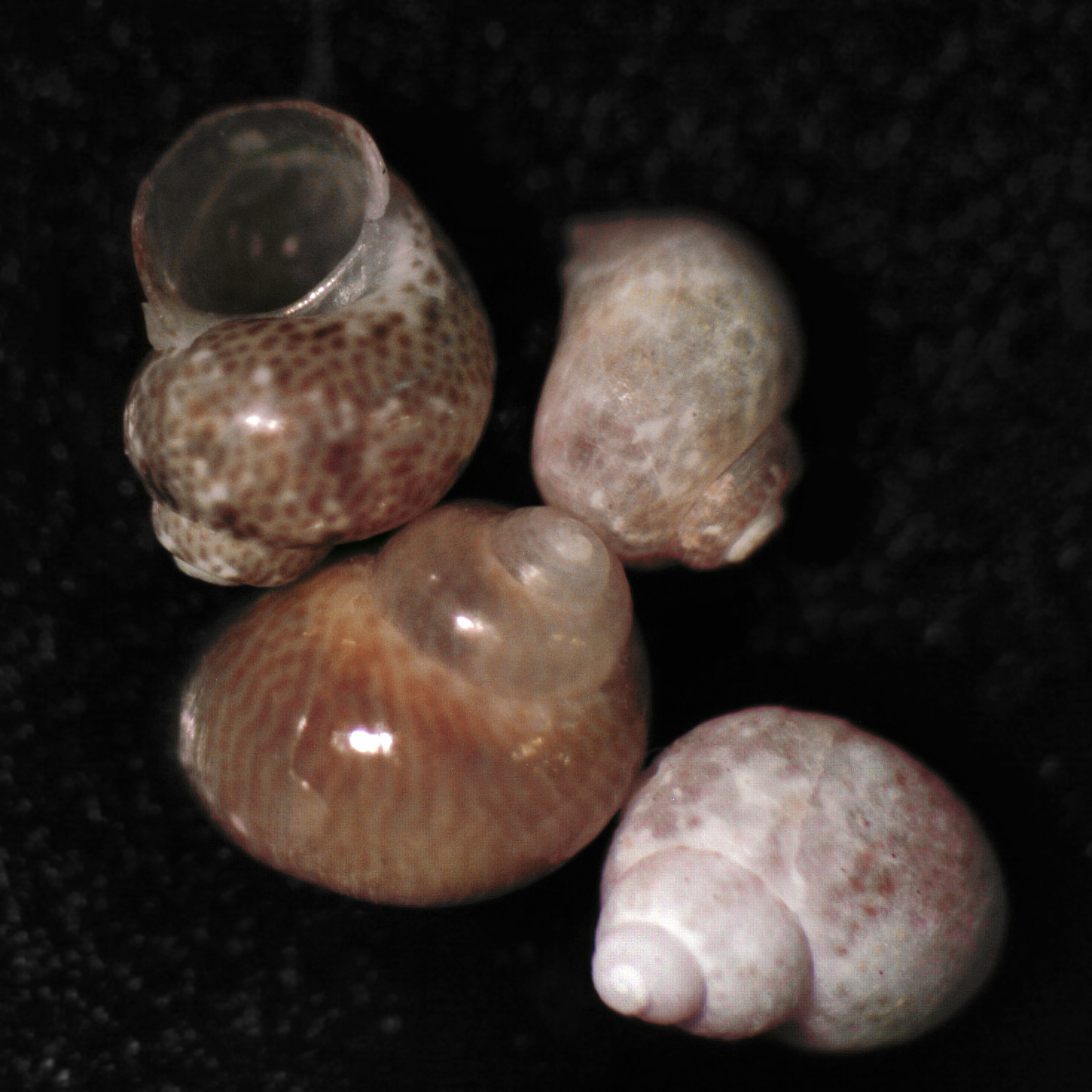
- Eulithidium thalassicola

Scientific classification
- Kingdom: Animalia
- Phylum: Mollusca
- Class: Gastropoda
- Subclass: Vetigastropoda
- Order: Trochida
- Family: Phasianellidae
- Subfamily: Tricoliinae
- Genus: Eulithidium; Pilsbry, 1898

Synonyms
- Eucosmia Carpenter, 1864, non Stephens, 1831 (replacement name)

= Eulithidium =

Genus of gastropods

Eulithidium is a genus of small colorful sea snails, marine gastropod mollusks in the family Phasianellidae, the pheasant shells.

Several species in this genus were originally placed in the genus Eucosmia. However, the name Eucosmia was pre-occupied in zoology for a group of moths established by Stephens in 1829. The molluscan Eucosmia was therefore called Eulithidium to distinguish it from the group of Lepidoptera.

== Species ==
Species within the genus Eulithidium include:

- Eulithidium adamsi (Philippi, 1853)
- Eulithidium affine (C. B. Adams, 1850)
- Eulithidium beaui (Robertson, 1958)
- Eulithidium bellum (M. Smith, 1937)
- Eulithidium comptum (Gould, 1855)
- Eulithidium cyclostoma (Carpenter, 1864)
- Eulithidium diantha (McLean, 1970)
- Eulithidium macleani (Marincovich, 1973)
- Eulithidium perforatum (Philippi, 1848)
- Eulithidium phasianella (Philippi, 1849)
- Eulithidium pterocladicum (Robertson, 1958)
- Eulithidium pulloides (Carpenter, 1865)
- Eulithidium rubrilineatum (Strong, 1928)
- Eulithidium substriatum (Carpenter, 1864)
- Eulithidium tessellatum (Potiez & Michaud, 1838)
- Eulithidium thalassicola (Robertson, 1958)
- Eulithidium umbilicatum (d'Orbigny, 1840)
- Eulithidium variegatum (Carpenter, 1864)

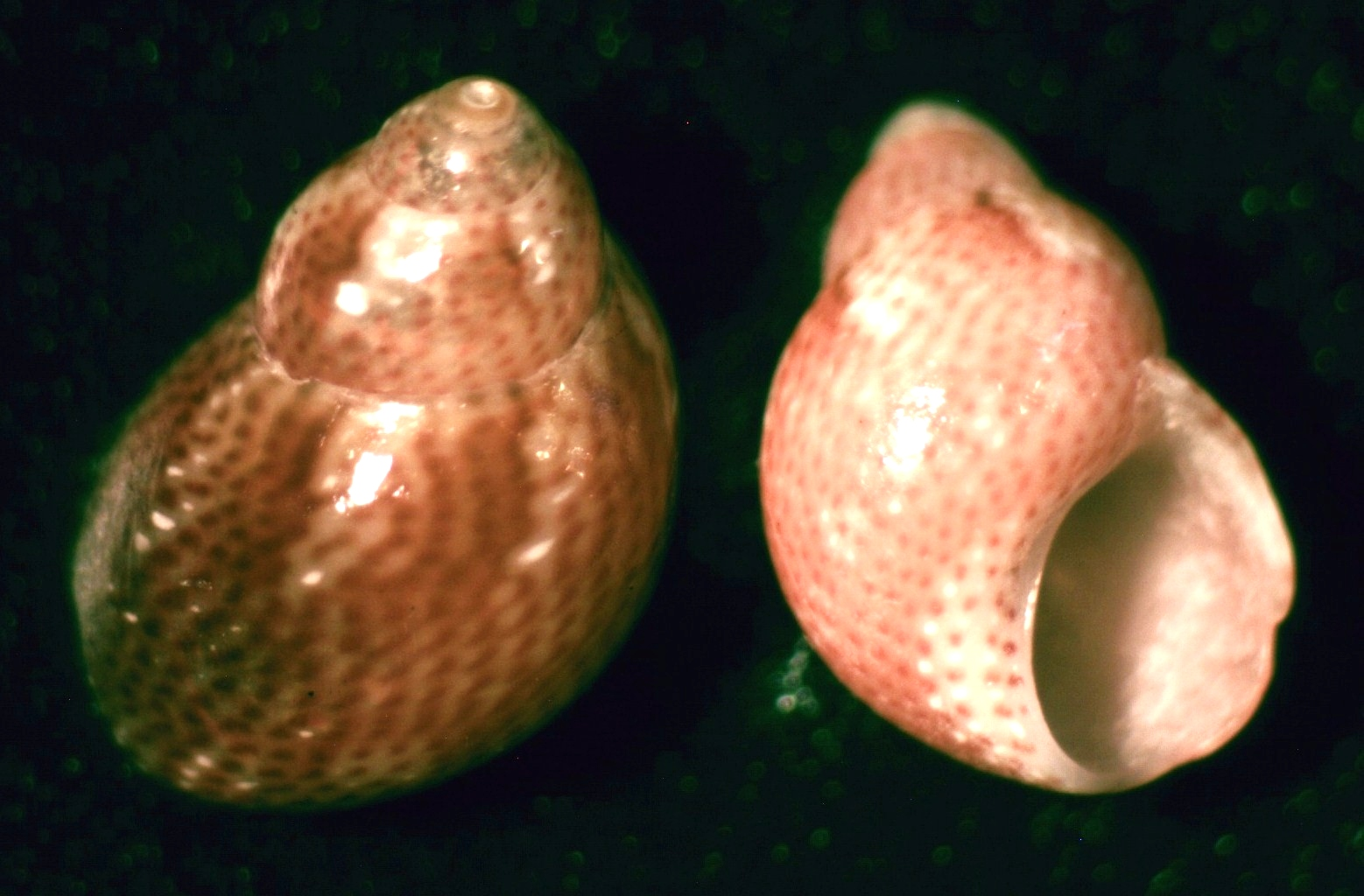
Eulithidium affine

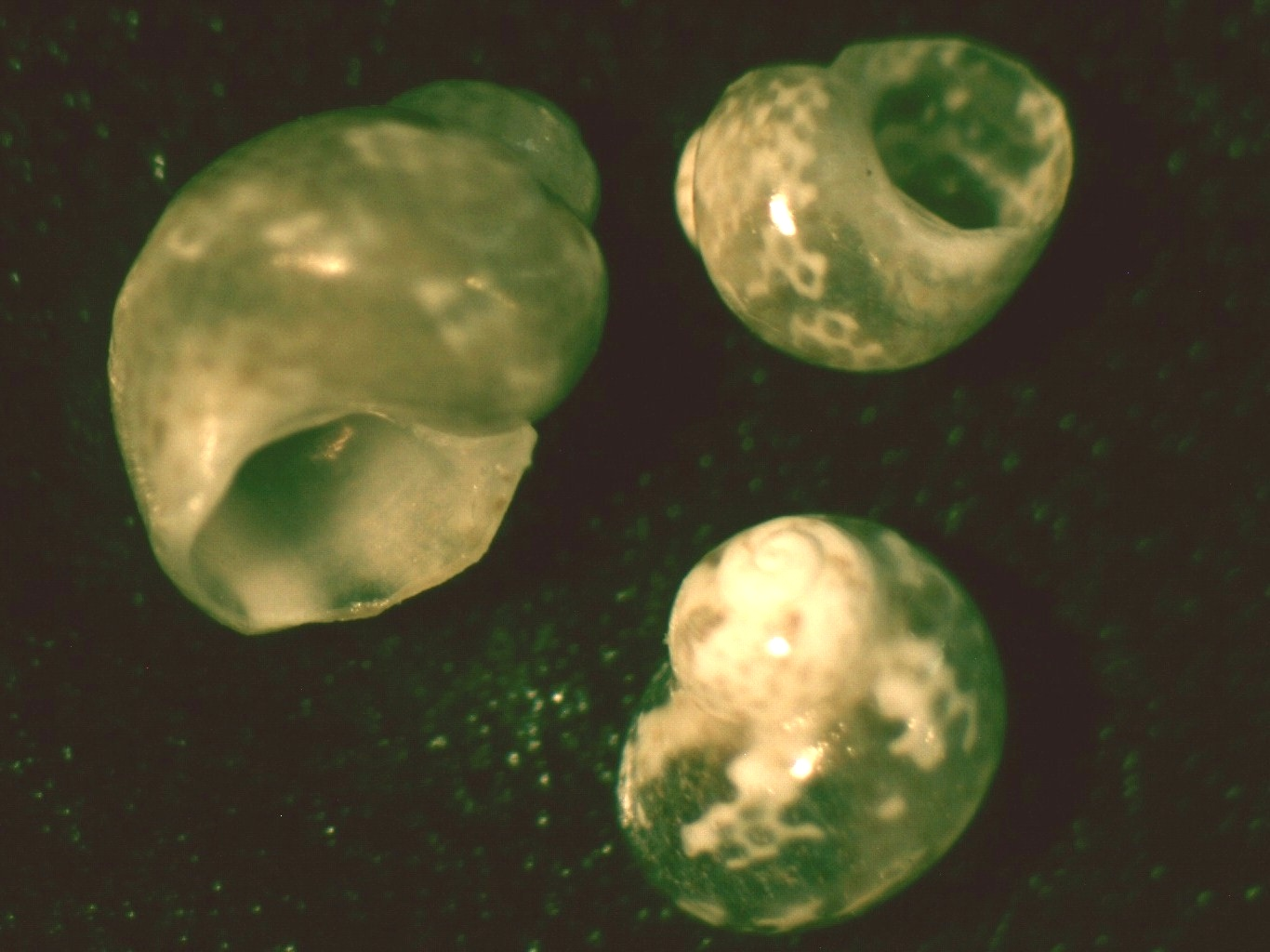
Eulithidium bellum
