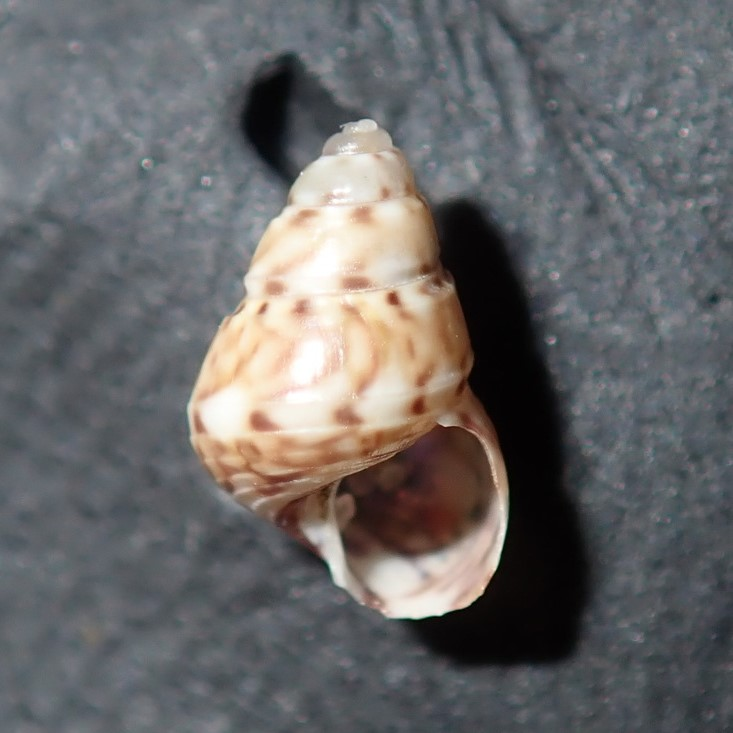

Scientific classification
- Kingdom: Animalia
- Phylum: Mollusca
- Class: Gastropoda
- Subclass: Vetigastropoda
- Order: Trochida
- Superfamily: Trochoidea
- Family: Trochidae
- Genus: Leiopyrga
- Species: L. cingulata

Binomial name
- Leiopyrga cingulata (A. Adams, 1864)

Synonyms
- Cantharidus cingulatus Hedley, 1913

= Leiopyrga cingulata =

Species of gastropod

Leiopyrga cingulata is a small species of sea snail, a marine gastropod mollusk in the family Trochidae, the top snails.

== Description ==
The narrowly perforate, thin shell has a pyramidal-turbinate shape. It is shining, purplish, the base whitish, with a series of rufous spots. The four whorls are marked with distant elevated cinguli (3 on the body whorl). The base of the shell is concentrically deeply lirate. The umbilical region is surrounded by an elevated ridge.

The whorls are encircled with three transverse ridges, and there is a conspicuous ridge around the region of the umbilicus.

== Distribution ==
This marine species is endemic to Australia and occurs off New South Wales and Queensland
