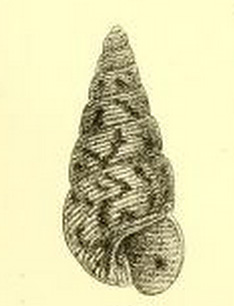
- Original drawing of a shell of Leiopyrga octona

Scientific classification
- Kingdom: Animalia
- Phylum: Mollusca
- Class: Gastropoda
- Subclass: Vetigastropoda
- Order: Trochida
- Superfamily: Trochoidea
- Family: Trochidae
- Genus: Leiopyrga
- Species: L. octona

Binomial name
- Leiopyrga octona Tate, 1891

= Leiopyrga octona =

Species of gastropod

Leiopyrga octona, common name the eight-ringed weed shell, is a species of small sea snail, a marine gastropod mollusk in the family Trochidae, the top snails.

== Description ==
The height of the shell attains 10 mm, its diameter 4.5 mm. The thin, turreted shell is narrowly perforate. It is shining, white with oblique axial or zigzag pinkish lines. The 8½ whorls are moderately convex and separated by a linear suture. The 2½ rufous, apical whorls are turbinately depressed, and they are smooth. The first two spire whorls are smooth, the third showing faint spiral lines which increase in strength with the revolution of the spire. The anterior whorls show eight to ten equal and equidistant, rounded, and rather depressed cinguli, which are a little wider than the furrows. The body whorl is equally and regularly cingulated. The base of the shell is convex. The aperture is oval. The thin outer lip is crenated on the margin. The thin columella is slightly thickened above and attenuates abruptly to the front. it is not perceptibly reflected. The umbilical groove is smooth.

== Distribution ==
This marine species is endemic to Australia and occurs off South Australia, Western Australia and Victoria.
