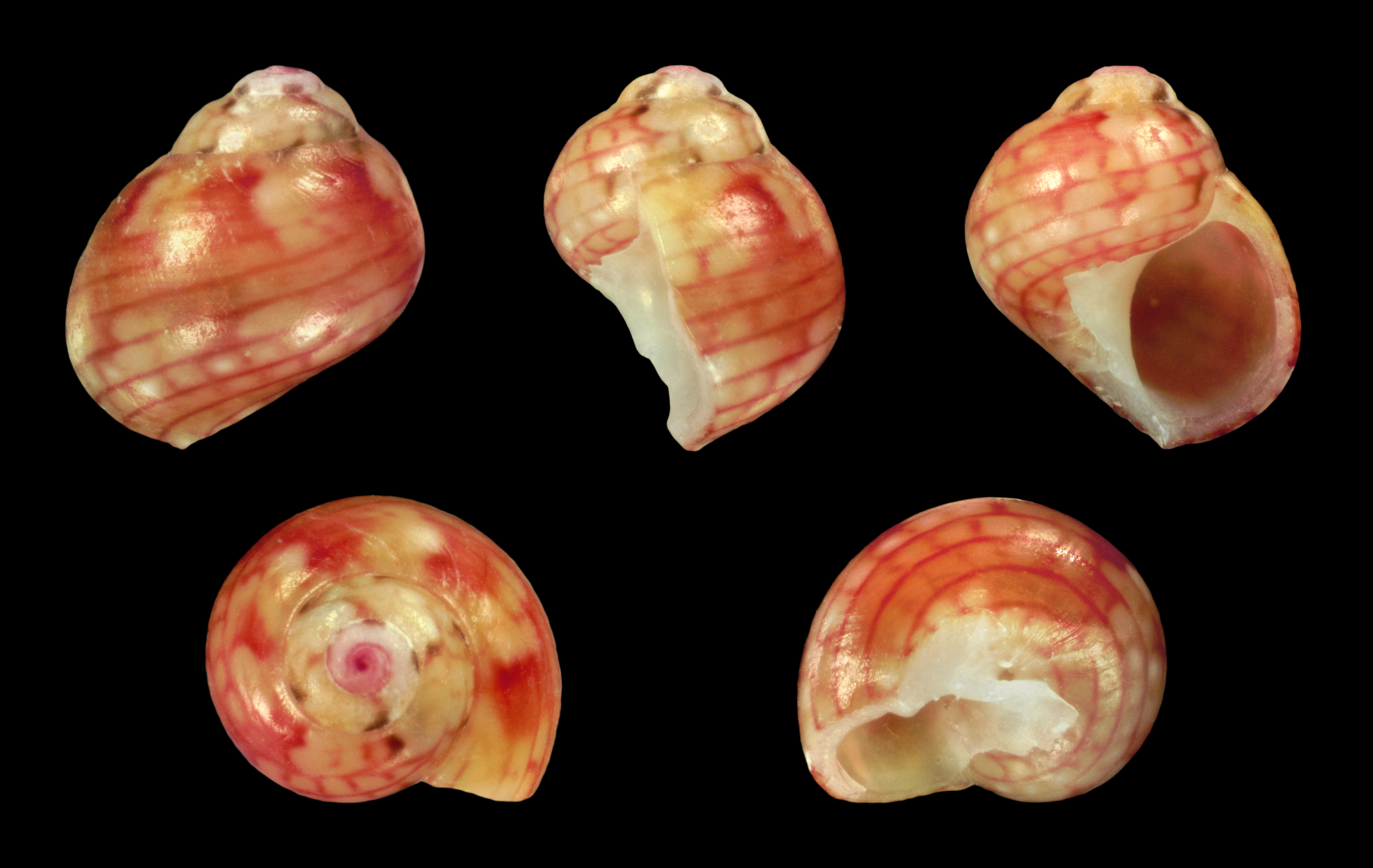

Scientific classification
- Kingdom: Animalia
- Phylum: Mollusca
- Class: Gastropoda
- Subclass: Vetigastropoda
- Order: Trochida
- Family: Phasianellidae
- Genus: Eulithidium
- Species: E. tessellatum

Binomial name
- Eulithidium tessellatum (Potiez & Michaud, 1838)

Synonyms
- Phasianella lipeata Krebs, 1864; Phasianella minuta Anton, 1838; Phasianella tessellata Potiez & Michaud, 1838 (original combination); Phasianella tesselata C. B. Adams, 1850; Turbo zebrinus d'Orbigny, 1842

= Eulithidium tessellatum =

Species of gastropod

Eulithidium tessellatum is a species of sea snail, a marine gastropod mollusc in the family Phasianellidae.

== Description ==
The shell size varies between 3 mm and 6 mm. The short and solid shell has an oval or ovate shape. The spire is conic. The apex is obtuse. The 4–5 smooth whorls are slightly convex, and rapidly increasing. The body whorl is large and obtusely angulate at the periphery. The sutures are lightly impressed. The oblique aperture is ovat. Its outer and inner margins are equally curved. The columella has a white callus. The umbilical region is excavated, and usually obviously perforated. The color of the shell is white, yellow or reddish, longitudinally clouded with white, red or brown. The color is sometimes broken into subsutural and peripheral series of flammules, encircled with close continuous narrow revolving obliquely descending, regularly spaced orange or red lines. This species and the Eulithidium affine (C. B. Adams, 1850) are very abundant in many West Indian localities. They are usually associated together. Fresh specimens of both exhibit microscopic revolving impressed striae.

== Distribution ==
This species is distributed in abundant numbers in the Gulf of Mexico and in the Caribbean Sea and the Lesser Antilles
