= Eulithidium variegatum =

Scientific classification
- Kingdom: Animalia
- Phylum: Mollusca
- Class: Gastropoda
- Subclass: Vetigastropoda
- Order: Trochida
- Superfamily: Trochoidea
- Family: Phasianellidae
- Subfamily: Tricoliinae
- Genus: Eulithidium
- Species: E. variegatum

Binomial name
- Eulithidium variegatum (Carpenter, 1864)

Synonyms
- Eucosmia substriata var. variegata Carpenter, 1864; Tricolia variegata (Carpenter, 1864)

Species of gastropod

Eulithidium variegatum is a species of small sea snail with calcareous opercula, a marine gastropod mollusk in the family Phasianellidae, the pheasant snails.

== Description ==
The small, smooth, bright shell has a turbinate shape. The outlines of the spire are convex, variously maculated with rose color and reddish brown. The four whorls are very convex, and rapidly increasing. The body whorl is produced anteriorly, separated by well impressed sutures. The nuclear whorls are regular. The apex is mammillated. The base of the shell is rounded. The umbilicus is carinated. The aperture is scarcely indented by the parietal margin. The acute peristome is nearly continuous. (original description by Carpenter)

== Distribution ==
This species occurs in the Pacific Ocean off Cape St. Lucas, Lower California.
