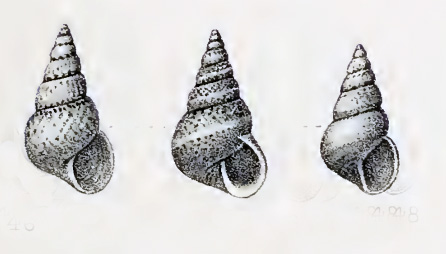
- Drawing with three different colorations of a shell of Leiopyrga lineolaris

Scientific classification
- Kingdom: Animalia
- Phylum: Mollusca
- Class: Gastropoda
- Subclass: Vetigastropoda
- Order: Trochida
- Superfamily: Trochoidea
- Family: Trochidae
- Genus: Leiopyrga
- Species: L. lineolaris

Binomial name
- Leiopyrga lineolaris (Gould, 1861)

Synonyms
- Bankivia (Leiopyrga) picturata Smith, E.A. 1884; Cantharidus lineolaris Gould, 1861 (original description); Cantharidus (Leiopyurga) picturata Tryon, 1887; Leiopyrga picturata H. & A. Adams, 1863; Trochus (Leiopyrga) picturata Watson

= Leiopyrga lineolaris =

Species of gastropod

Leiopyrga lineolaris, common name the lined kelp shell, is a species of sea snail, a marine gastropod mollusk in the family Trochidae, the top snails.

== Description ==
The height of the adult shell varies between 8 mm and 12 mm, its diameter between 5 mm and 7 mm. The turreted, slender, thin shell is narrowly perforate. It is shining, white, with longitudinal undulating or zigzag pinkish or purplish lines, often uniting to form spots at the periphery, or prominently angled there. Sometimes it shows spiral bands at the periphery and around the umbilicus. The about 7 whorls are convex, and more or less carinated at the periphery. The carina is exserted above the sutures on the spire. The surface of the base of the shell is marked by distant impressed concentric grooves. The suture is margined. The aperture is oval. The outer lip is thin. The thin columella is arcuate not truncate, and slightly expanded above, but not covering the umbilicus.

== Distribution ==
This marine species is endemic to Australia and occurs off New South Wales, Tasmania and Victoria.
