= Tricolia speciosa =

- Shell of Tricolia speciosa (lectotype at MNHN, Paris)

Scientific classification
- Kingdom: Animalia
- Phylum: Mollusca
- Class: Gastropoda
- Subclass: Vetigastropoda
- Order: Trochida
- Family: Phasianellidae
- Genus: Tricolia
- Species: T. speciosa

Binomial name
- Tricolia speciosa (Mühlfeld, 1824)

Synonyms
- Phasianella ferussaci Guerin 1829; Phasianella lymnaeoides Anton 1839; Phasianella speciosa var. albina Monterosato 1880; Phasianella speciosa var. atra Bucquoy, Dautzenberg & Dollfus 1884; Phasianella speciosa var. atrata Dautzenberg 1883; Phasianella speciosa var. aurea Dautzenberg 1882; Phasianella speciosa var. lactea Monterosato 1880; Phasianella speciosa var. maculata Monterosato 1880; Phasianella speciosa var. major Monterosato 1880; Phasianella speciosa var. normalis Monterosato 1880; Phasianella speciosa var. purpurea Dautzenberg 1883; Phasianella speciosa var. sanguinea Bucquoy, Dautzenberg & Dollfus 1884; Phasianella speciosa var. spirolineata Monterosato 1880; Phasianella speciosa var. viridis Monterosato 1880; Phasianella vieuxii Payraudeau, 1826; Tricolia nicaeensis Risso1826; Tricolia rentneri Nordsieck 1973; Tricolia rubra Risso1826; Tricolia speciosa var. seriopunctata Monterosato 1884; Tricolia speciosa var. virescens Monterosato 1884; Turbo speciosus Mühlfeld, 1824; Turbo vieuxi Payraudeau 1826

Species of gastropod

Tricolia speciosa, common name the Mediterranean pheasant, is a species of sea snail, a marine gastropod mollusk in the family Phasianellidae.

== Description ==
The height of the shell varies between 7 mm and 13 mm. The thin, shining shell has an ovate-elongate shape. It is white, with alternate red and white short flammules below the sutures, and several revolving series of white spots. The interstices are covered with fine pink or yellowish obliquely descending lines. The five, convex whorls are separated by deeply constricting sutures. The aperture is long-oval, and rather produced below. The posterior angle is occupied by a heavy callus.

== Distribution ==
This species occurs in the Mediterranean Sea and in the Adriatic Sea.
