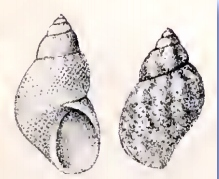
- Two views of a shell of Eulithidium adamsi

Scientific classification
- Kingdom: Animalia
- Phylum: Mollusca
- Class: Gastropoda
- Subclass: Vetigastropoda
- Order: Trochida
- Family: Phasianellidae
- Genus: Eulithidium
- Species: E. adamsi

Binomial name
- Eulithidium adamsi (Philippi, 1853)

Synonyms
- Phasianella adamsi Philippi, 1853 (original combination); Phasianella affinis C.B. Adams, 1850; Phasianella brevis C. B. Adams, 1850; Phasianella concinna C.B. Adams, 1850; Tricolia adamsi (Philippi, 1853)

= Eulithidium adamsi =

Species of gastropod

Eulithidium adamsi is a species of minute colorful sea snail, a marine gastropod mollusk in the family Phasianellidae, the pheasant shells.

== Description ==
The shell grows to a height of 3.8 mm. The elongate shell has a pointed ovate shape. It is rather thin, smooth, and shining. The spire is conic. It contains about 5 rather convex whorls, separated by well impressed sutures. The rose colored apex is acute. The oval aperture is oblique. The outer lip is thin and translucent. The Columella has with a white callus which is somewhat distended at the slightly impressed and grooved subperforate or imperforate umbilical region. The color of the shell is white, yellow or pale rose, more or less clouded longitudinally with rose, orange or brown, sometimes only with subsutural and peripheral series of short flammules. The entire surface is closely and regularly punctate with pink or orange, and white.

== Distribution ==
This species occurs in the Gulf of Mexico, the Caribbean Sea and the Lesser Antilles.
