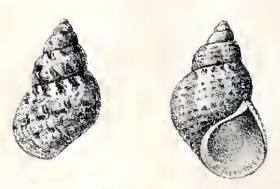
- Two views of a shell of Phasianella nivosa

Scientific classification
- Kingdom: Animalia
- Phylum: Mollusca
- Class: Gastropoda
- Subclass: Vetigastropoda
- Order: Trochida
- Family: Phasianellidae
- Genus: Phasianella
- Species: P. nivosa

Binomial name
- Phasianella nivosa Reeve, 1862

= Phasianella nivosa =

Species of gastropod

Phasianella nivosa is a species of sea snail, a marine gastropod mollusk in the family Phasianellidae.

== Description ==
The shell grows to a height of 2 cm. The spire attains a moderate height with rounded whorls. The color of the shell has a pale to dark background with lighter, thick for thin, broken bands.

== Habitat ==
This species is found on algae in the eulittoral zone.

== Distribution ==
This species occurs in the Indian Ocean off Tanzania and Madagascar.
