= Tricolia fordiana =

Scientific classification
- Kingdom: Animalia
- Phylum: Mollusca
- Class: Gastropoda
- Subclass: Vetigastropoda
- Order: Trochida
- Superfamily: Trochoidea
- Family: Phasianellidae
- Subfamily: Tricoliinae
- Genus: Tricolia
- Species: T. fordiana

Binomial name
- Tricolia fordiana (Pilsbry, 1888)

Synonyms
- Phasianella elachista Melvill, 1901; Phasianella minima Melvill, 1896; Phasianella [(Tricolia)] fordiana Pilsbry, 1888

Species of gastropod

Tricolia fordiana is a species of small sea snail with calcareous opercula, a marine gastropod mollusk in the family Phasianellidae, the pheasant snails.

== Description ==
The height of the shell varies between 2 mm and 5 mm.

== Distribution ==
This marine species occurs in the Central Indo- West Pacific region and off Australia.
