= Odostomia sulcosa =

Scientific classification
- Kingdom: Animalia
- Phylum: Mollusca
- Class: Gastropoda
- Family: Pyramidellidae
- Genus: Odostomia
- Species: O. sulcosa

Binomial name
- Odostomia sulcosa (Mighels, 1843)

Synonyms
- Odostomia morseana Bartsch, 1909; Odostomia sulcata Verrill, 1880

Species of gastropod

Odostomia sulcosa is a species of sea snail, a marine gastropod mollusc in the family Pyramidellidae, the pyrams and their allies.

== Description ==
The shell has a length of 2.5 mm.

== Distribution ==
The species is found at a depth of 82 m. This species occurs in the following locations:

- Caribbean Sea
- Cuba
- Northwest Atlantic

== Notes ==
Additional information regarding this species:

- Distribution: Off Georges Bank and Martha's Vineyard
