= Gabrielona sulcifera =

Scientific classification
- Kingdom: Animalia
- Phylum: Mollusca
- Class: Gastropoda
- Subclass: Vetigastropoda
- Order: Trochida
- Family: Phasianellidae
- Genus: Gabrielona
- Species: G. sulcifera

Binomial name
- Gabrielona sulcifera Robertson, 1973

Synonyms
- Eucosmia brevis auct. non d'Orbigny, 1842; Phasianella brevis d'Orbigny, Dall, W.H., 1889

Species of gastropod

Gabrielona sulcifera is a species of sea snail, a marine gastropod mollusk in the family Phasianellidae.

== Description ==
The size of the shell varies between 1.3 mm and 3 mm.

Its functional group is Benthos.

Its feeding type is grazer.

== Distribution ==
This species occurs in the Caribbean Sea, the Gulf of Mexico and the Lesser Antilles; in the Atlantic Ocean off Brazil.
