= Gabrielona nepeanensis =

Scientific classification
- Kingdom: Animalia
- Phylum: Mollusca
- Class: Gastropoda
- Subclass: Vetigastropoda
- Order: Trochida
- Superfamily: Trochoidea
- Family: Phasianellidae
- Subfamily: Gabrieloninae
- Genus: Gabrielona
- Species: G. nepeanensis

Binomial name
- Gabrielona nepeanensis (Gatliff & Gabriel, 1908)

Synonyms
- Phasianella nepeanensis Gatliff & Gabriel, 1908

Species of gastropod

Gabrielona nepeanensis is a species of small sea snail with calcareous opercula, a marine gastropod mollusk in the family Phasianellidae, the pheasant snails.

== Description ==
The size of the shell varies between 0.8 mm and 2 mm.

== Distribution ==
This marine species occurs off Victoria, South Australia and Tasmania.
