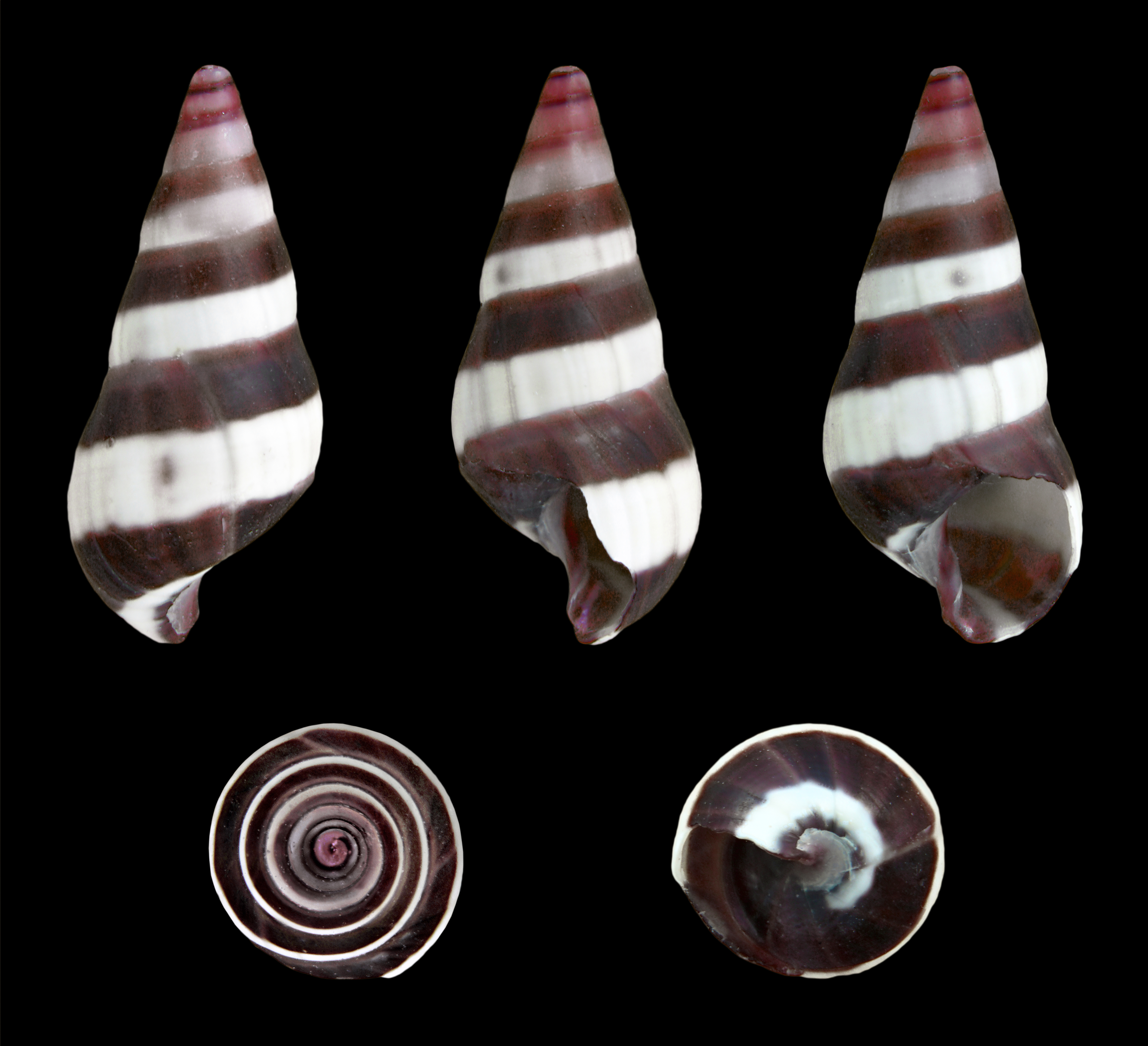
- Bankivia fasciata shell

Scientific classification
- Kingdom: Animalia
- Phylum: Mollusca
- Class: Gastropoda
- Subclass: Vetigastropoda
- Order: Trochida
- Superfamily: Trochoidea
- Family: Trochidae
- Genus: Bankivia; Krauss, 1848

Type species
- Bankivia varians Krauss, 1848

= Bankivia =

Genus of gastropods

Bankivia is a genus of sea snails, marine gastropod mollusks in the family Trochidae, the top snails.

== Description ==
The imperforate, elongated, narrow, thin shell has a conical shape. It is slightly pearly. The aperture is small, about one-third the length of shell . The columella is slightly twisted, and subtruncated toward the base.

== Species ==
Species within the genus Bankivia include:

- Bankivia fasciata (Menke, 1830)
- † Bankivia howitti Pritchard, 1904

Species were brought into synonymy:

- Bankivia lugubris Gould, 1861: synonym of Bankivia fasciata (Menke, 1830)
- Bankivia major A. Adams, 1853: synonym of Bankivia fasciata (Menke, 1830)
- Bankivia nitida A. Adams, 1853: synonym of Bankivia fasciata (Menke, 1830)
- Bankivia purpurascens A. Adams, 1853: synonym of Bankivia fasciata (Menke, 1830)
- Bankivia varians Krauss, 1848: synonym of Bankivia fasciata (Menke, 1830)
