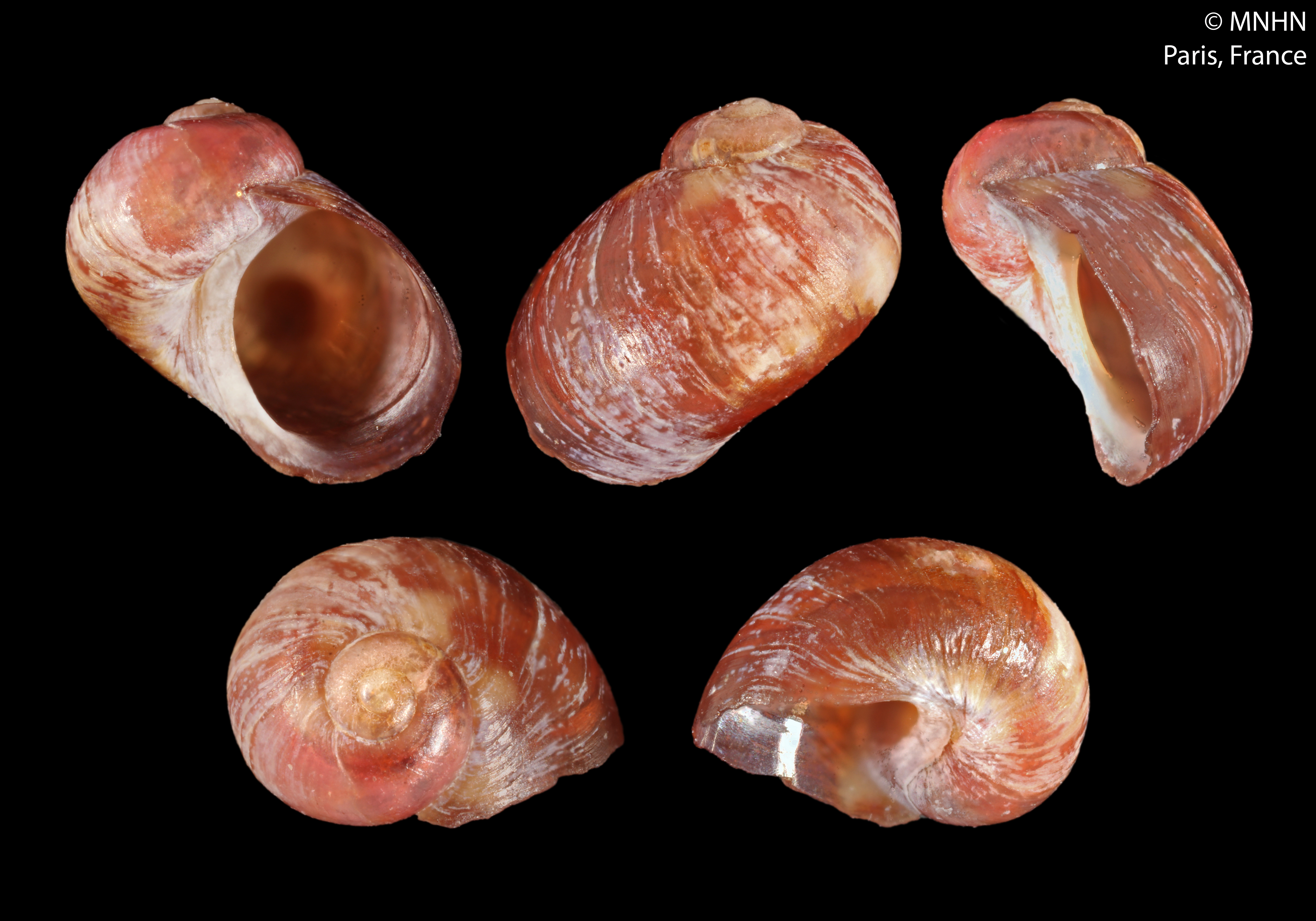
- Shell of Tricolia munieri (lectotype at MNHN, Paris)

Scientific classification
- Kingdom: Animalia
- Phylum: Mollusca
- Class: Gastropoda
- Subclass: Vetigastropoda
- Order: Trochida
- Superfamily: Trochoidea
- Family: Phasianellidae
- Subfamily: Tricoliinae
- Genus: Tricolia
- Species: T. munieri

Binomial name
- Tricolia munieri (Vélain, 1877)

Synonyms
- Phasianella brevis Vélain, 1877; Phasianella munieri Vélain, 1877; Phasianella velaini Lamy, 1931

= Tricolia munieri =

Species of gastropod

Tricolia munieri is a species of small sea snail with calcareous opercula, a marine gastropod mollusk in the family Phasianellidae, the pheasant snails.

== Distribution ==
This marine species occurs off Amsterdam Island.
