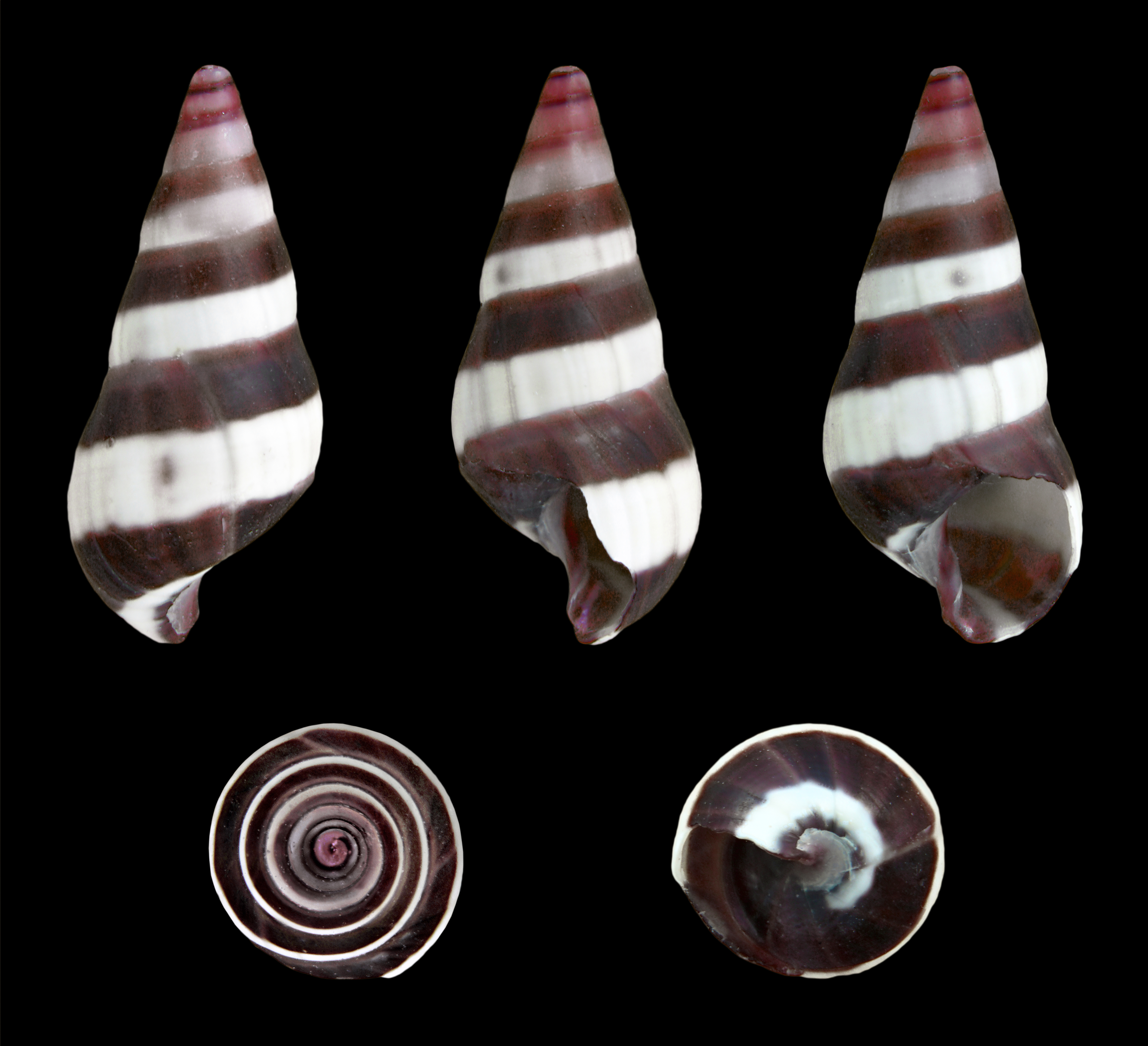

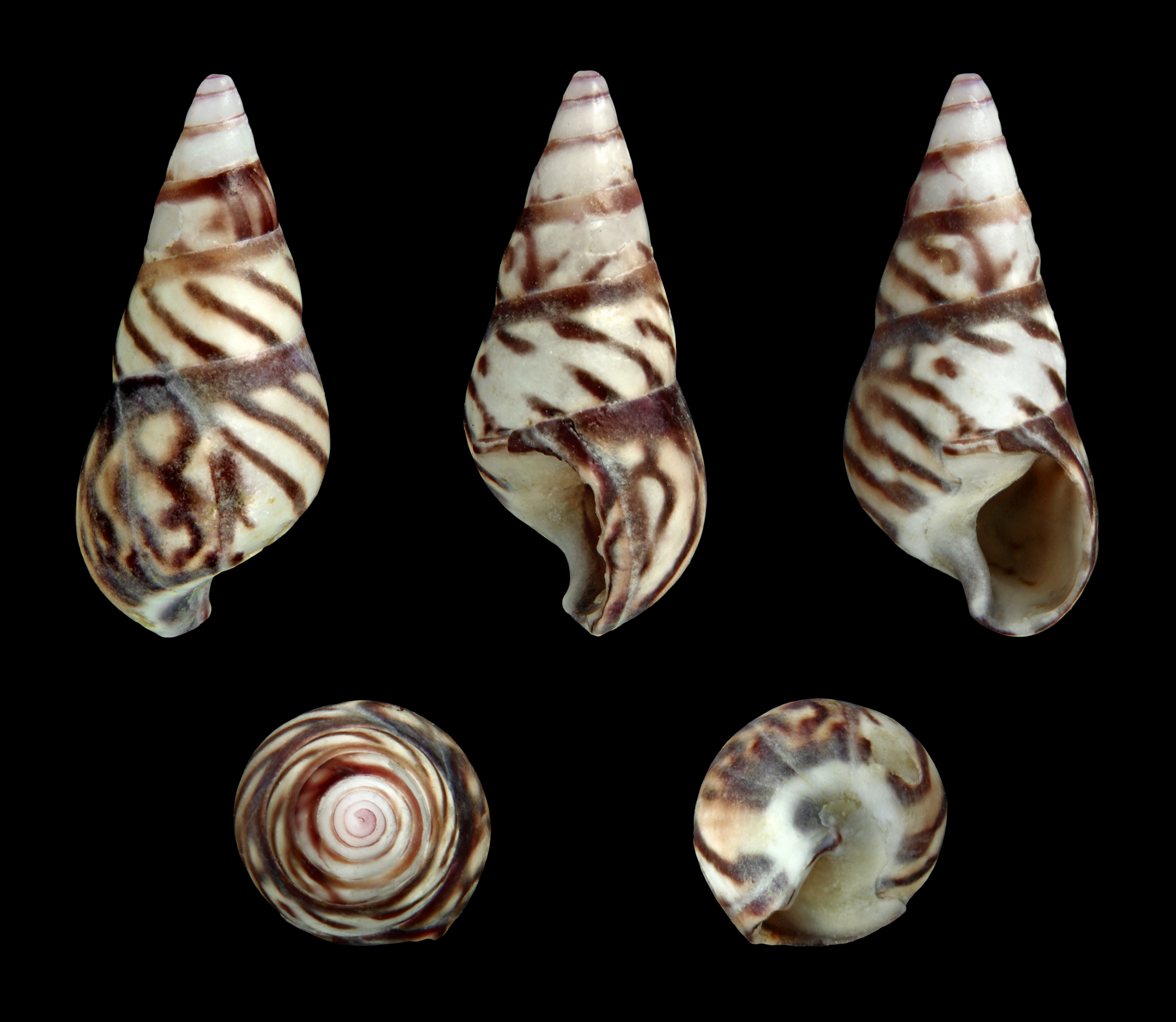

Scientific classification
- Kingdom: Animalia
- Phylum: Mollusca
- Class: Gastropoda
- Subclass: Vetigastropoda
- Order: Trochida
- Superfamily: Trochoidea
- Family: Trochidae
- Genus: Bankivia
- Species: B. fasciata

Binomial name
- Bankivia fasciata (Menke, 1830)

Synonyms
- Bankivia lugubris Gould, 1861; Bankivia major A. Adams, 1853; Bankivia nitida A. Adams, 1853; Bankivia purpurascens A. Adams, 1853; Bankivia varians Krauss, 1848; Cantharidus fasciatus (Menke, 1830); Phasianella fasciata Menke, 1830 (original description); Phasianella fulminata Menke, 1830; Phasianella undatella Menke, 1830

= Bankivia fasciata =

Species of gastropod

Bankivia fasciata, common name the banded kelp shell, is a species of sea snail, a marine gastropod mollusk in the family Trochidae, the top snails.

== Description ==
The length of the shell varies between 15 mm and 25 mm. The thin, imperforate, elongated shell has a turreted shape. This is a variable species in size and coloration. It is polished and shining, white, creamy or pink, with spiral bands of pink, purplish-red or purplish-brown, or narrow oblique zigzag stripes of pinkish-brown, usually with a narrow subsutural fascia of dark or pinkish. The spire is elevated and slender. The dark apex is a little blunt. The about 9 whorls are, very slightly convex, and a trifle impressed below the sutures. The surface (under a lens) is very densely, finely spirally striate. The body whorl is rounded. The base of the shell shows a few concentric, separated, impressed lines. The aperture is ovate. The thin outer lipis acute. The sinuous columella is arcuate above and narrowly reflexed, obliquely truncate below.

== Distribution ==
This marine species occurs in the Gulf of Aqaba, off Mozambique and off New South Wales to South Australia, and off Tasmania
