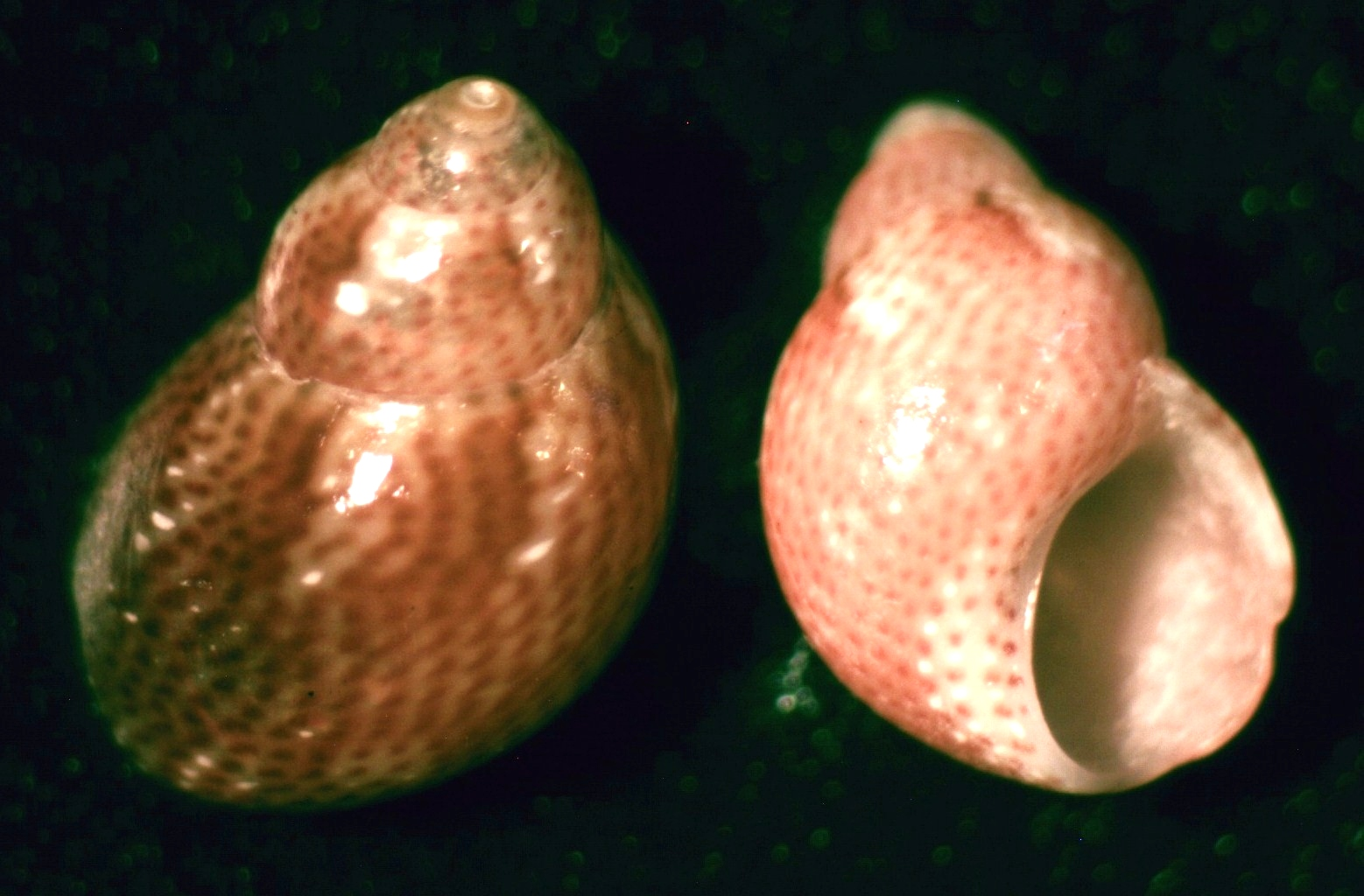
- Two views of a shell of Eulithidium affine

Scientific classification
- Kingdom: Animalia
- Phylum: Mollusca
- Class: Gastropoda
- Subclass: Vetigastropoda
- Order: Trochida
- Family: Phasianellidae
- Genus: Eulithidium
- Species: E. affine

Binomial name
- Eulithidium affine (C. B. Adams, 1850)

Synonyms
- Eulithidium affine affine (C. B. Adams, 1850); Eulithidium affine cruentum Robertson, 1958; Phasianella affinis C. B. Adams, 1850; Phasianella brevis C. B. Adams, 1850; Phasianella concinna C. B. Adams, 1850; Phasianella umbilicatum auct. non d'Orbigny, 1842; Tricolia adamsi (Philippi, 1853); Tricolia affine C. B. Adams, 1850; Tricolia affinis cruenta Robertson, 1958; Tricolia cruenta Robertson, 1958; Turbo umbilicata auct. non d'Orbigny, 1842

= Eulithidium affine =

Species of gastropod

Eulithidium affine, common name the polka-dot pheasant or the spotted pheasant, is a species of sea snail, a marine gastropod mollusk in the family Phasianellidae.

== Description ==
The height of the shell reaches 6.2 mm. The elongate shell has a pointed ovate shape. It is thin, smooth, and shining. The spire is conic. It contains about 5 rather convex whorls, separated by well impressed sutures. The acute apex is rose colored. The oval aperture is oblique. The outer lip is thin and translucent. The columella has a white callus which is somewhat distended at the slightly impressed and grooved subperforate or imperforate umbilical region. The color of the shell is white, yellow or pale rose, more or less clouded longitudinally with rose, orange or brown, sometimes only with subsutural and peripheral series of short flammules, the entire surface closely and regularly punctate with pink or orange, and white.

== Distribution ==
This species occurs in the Gulf of Mexico, the Caribbean Sea and the Lesser Antilles; in the Atlantic Ocean off Brazil.
