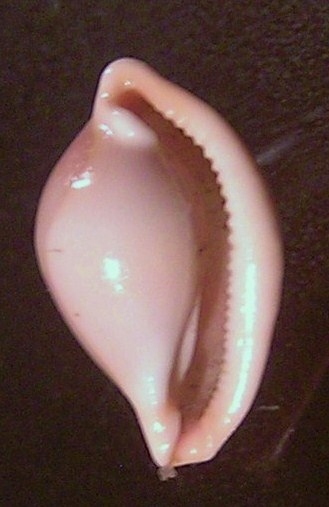
- Pseudosimnia carnea

Scientific classification
- Kingdom: Animalia
- Phylum: Mollusca
- Class: Gastropoda
- Subclass: Caenogastropoda
- Order: Littorinimorpha
- Family: Ovulidae
- Subfamily: Prionovolvinae; Fehse, 2007

= Prionovolvinae =

Subfamily of molluscs

Prionovolvinae is a subfamily of the gastropod family Ovulidae, proposed by Fehse in 2007.

== Genera ==
The following genera are recognised in the subfamily Prionovolvinae:

- Archivolva Lorenz & Fehse, 2009
- Calpurnus Montfort, 1810
- Carpiscula Cate, 1973
- Crenavolva Cate, 1973
- Cuspivolva Cate, 1973
- Dentiovula Habe, 1961
- Diminovula Iredale, 1930
- Globovula Cate, 1973
- Habuprionovolva Azuma, 1970
- Margovula Iredale, 1935
- Primovula Thiele, 1925
- Prionovolva Iredale, 1930
- Procalpurnus Thiele, 1929
- Prosimnia Schilder, 1927
- Pseudosimnia Schilder, 1927
- Rotaovula Cate & Azuma in Cate, 1973
- Sandalia Cate, 1973
- Serratovolva Cate, 1973
- Testudovolva Cate, 1973
