= Prionovolva =

Scientific classification
- Kingdom: Animalia
- Phylum: Mollusca
- Class: Gastropoda
- Subclass: Caenogastropoda
- Order: Littorinimorpha
- Family: Ovulidae
- Genus: Prionovolva; Iredale, 1930

Type species
- Ovulum breve Sowerby I, 1828

Synonyms
- Labiovolva Cate, 1973

Genus of gastropods

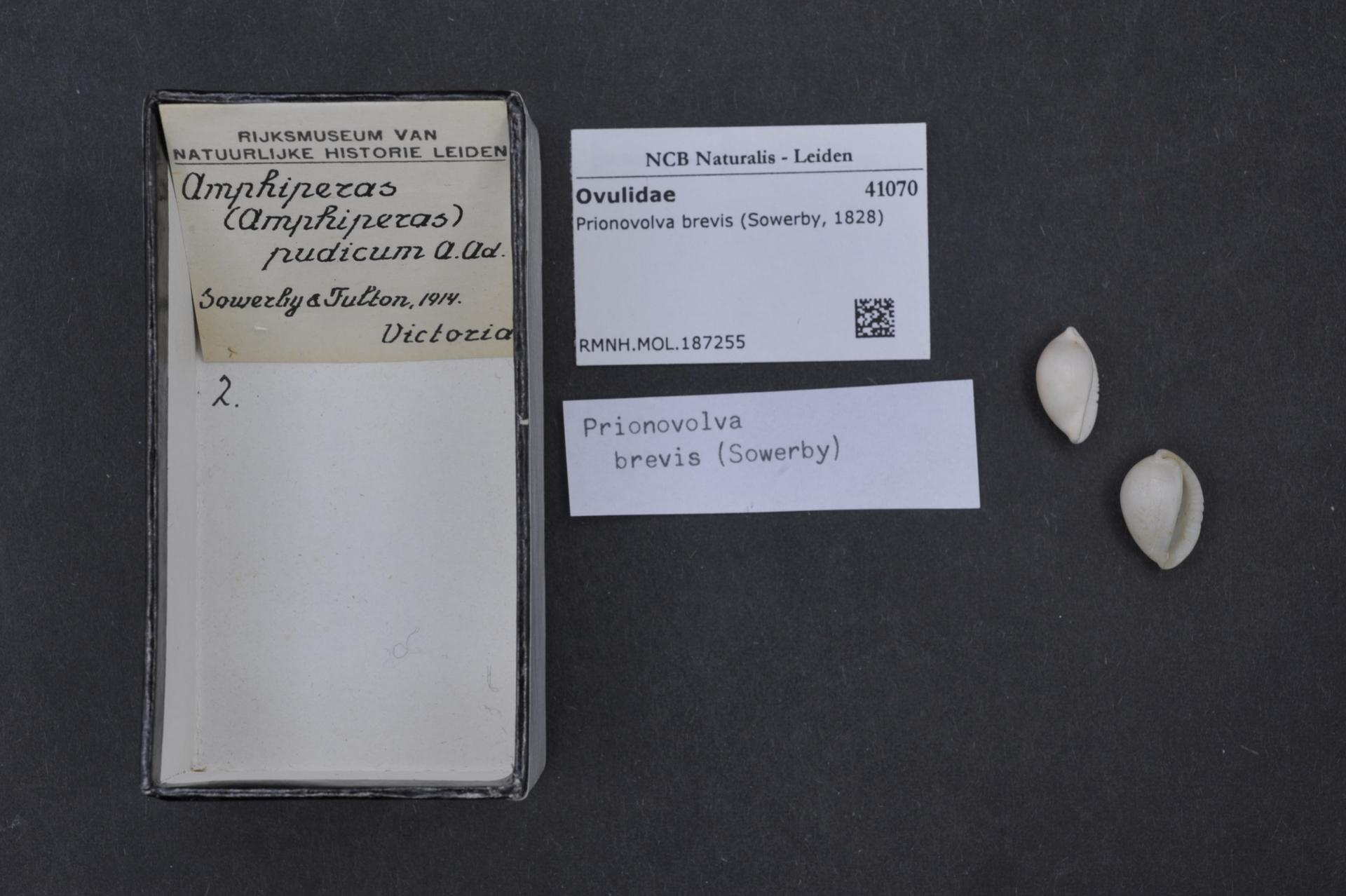
Prionovolva brevis

Prionovolva is a genus of sea snails, marine gastropod mollusks in the family Ovulidae.

== Species ==
Species within the genus Prionovolva include:

- Prionovolva brevis (G.B. Sowerby I, 1828)
- Prionovolva choshiensis (Cate, 1973)
- Prionovolva melonis Rosenberg, 2010

Synonymized species

- Prionovolva aenigma Azuma & Cate, 1971: synonym of Habuprionovolva aenigma (Azuma & Cate, 1971)
- Prionovolva aureomarginata Shikama, 1973: synonym of Pseudosimnia pyrulina (A. Adams, 1854)
- Prionovolva brevis sensu Allan, 1956 : synonym of Testudovolva nipponensis (Pilsbry, 1913)
- Prionovolva castanea Cate, 1978: synonym of Prionovolva brevis (Sowerby I, 1828)
- Prionovolva cavanaghi Schilder, 1941: synonym of Globovula cavanaghi (Iredale, 1931)
- Prionovolva ericae Cossignani & Calo, 2002: synonym of Testudovolva ericae (Cossignani & Calo, 2002)
- Prionovolva freemani Liltved & Millard, 1994: synonym of Testudovolva freemani (Liltved & Millard, 1994)
- Prionovolva fruticum (Reeve, 1865) : synonym of Prionovolva brevis (Sowerby I, 1828)
- Prionovolva nebula Azuma & Cate, 1971 : synonym of Testudovolva nebula (Azuma & Cate, 1971)
- Prionovolva nivea Cate, 1974: synonym of Prionovolva brevis (G. B. Sowerby I, 1828)
- Prionovolva nubeculata (Sowerby II in A. Adams & Reeve, 1848) : synonym of Prionovolva brevis (Sowerby I, 1828)
- Prionovolva pudica: synonym of Prionovolva brevis (Sowerby I, 1828)
- Prionovolva pulchella (H. Adams, 1873): synonym of Testudovolva pulchella H. Adams, 1874
- Prionovolva wilsoniana Cate, 1973: synonym of Prionovolva brevis (Sowerby I, 1828)
