= Cymbovula =

Scientific classification
- Kingdom: Animalia
- Phylum: Mollusca
- Class: Gastropoda
- Subclass: Caenogastropoda
- Order: Littorinimorpha
- Family: Ovulidae
- Subfamily: Simniinae
- Genus: Cymbovula; Cate, 1973

Synonyms
- Cymbula Cate, 1973 (Junior homonym of Cymbula H. & A. Adams, 1854)

Genus of gastropods

Cymbovula is a genus of sea snails, marine gastropod mollusks in the family Ovulidae.

== Species ==
Species within the genus Cymbovula include:

- Cymbovula acicularis (Lamarck, 1810)
- Cymbovula bebae Fernandes & Ròlan, 1995

Species brought into synonymy

- Cymbovula bahamensis Cate, 1973: synonym of Cymbovula acicularis (Lamarck, 1811)
- Cymbovula bratcherae Cate, 1973: synonym of Simnialena rufa (G. B. Sowerby I, 1832)
- Cymbovula cylindrica Ma, 1997: synonym of Cuspivolva queenslandica (Cate, 1974)
- Cymbovula deflexa (G. B. Sowerby II, 1848): synonym of Naviculavolva deflexa (G. B. Sowerby II, 1848)
- Cymbovula guandongensis Ma, 1997: synonym of Cuspivolva queenslandica (Cate, 1974)
- Cymbovula massierorum Fehse, 1999: synonym of Naviculavolva massierorum (Fehse, 1999)
- Cymbovula segaliana Cate, 1976: synonym of Cuspivolva queenslandica (Cate, 1974)
