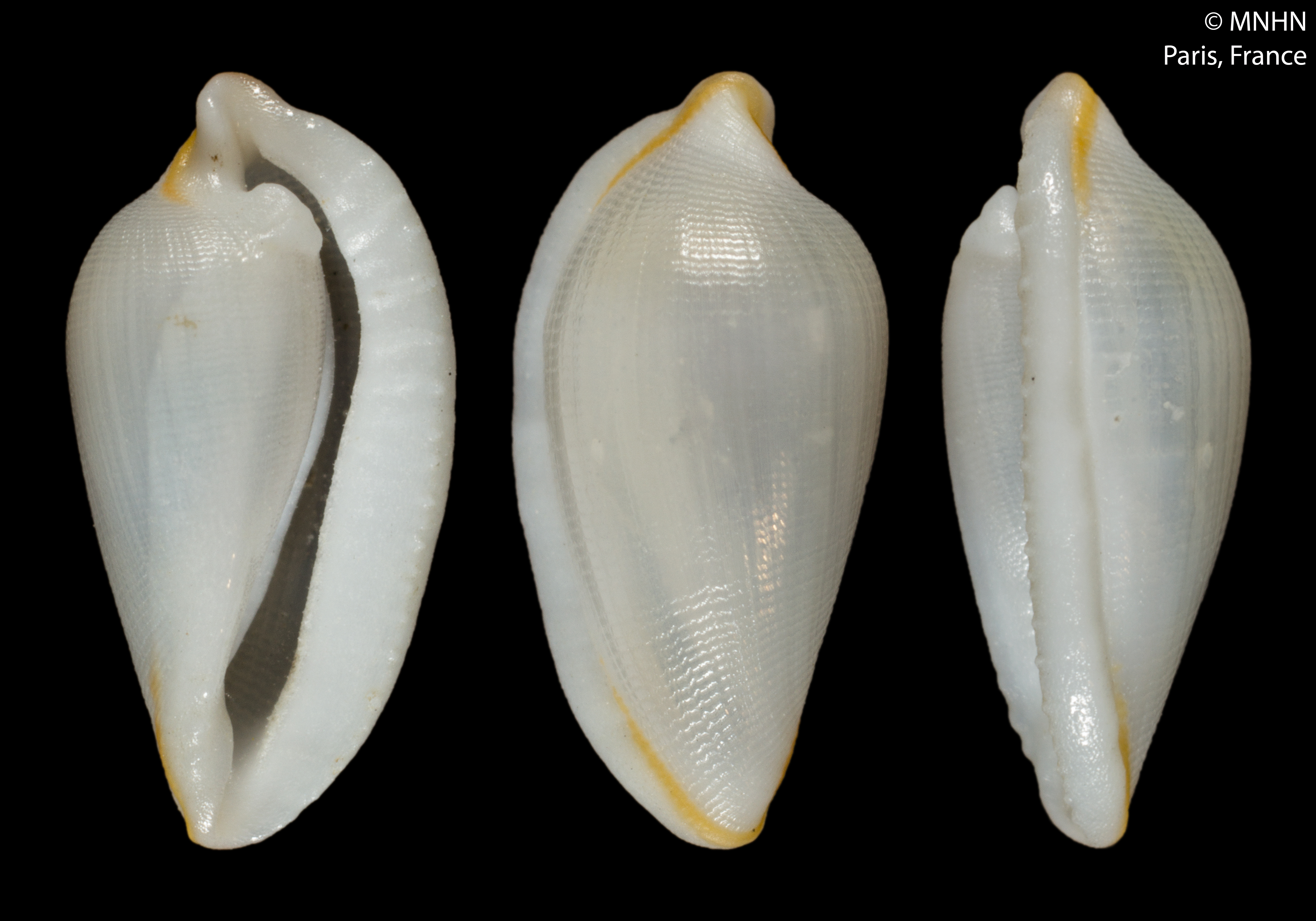
- Shell of Carpiscula virginiae (holotype at MNHN, Paris)

Scientific classification
- Kingdom: Animalia
- Phylum: Mollusca
- Class: Gastropoda
- Subclass: Caenogastropoda
- Order: Littorinimorpha
- Family: Ovulidae
- Genus: Carpiscula
- Species: C. virginiae

Binomial name
- Carpiscula virginiae Lorenz & Fehse, 2009

= Carpiscula virginiae =

Species of gastropod

Carpiscula virginiae is a species of sea snail, a marine gastropod mollusc in the family Ovulidae, the ovulids, cowry allies or false cowries.

== Distribution ==
This marine species occurs off Réunion.
