= Simnialena ilhabelaensis =

Scientific classification
- Kingdom: Animalia
- Phylum: Mollusca
- Class: Gastropoda
- Subclass: Caenogastropoda
- Order: Littorinimorpha
- Family: Ovulidae
- Genus: Simnialena
- Species: S. ilhabelaensis

Binomial name
- Simnialena ilhabelaensis Fehse, 2001

Species of gastropod

Simnialena ilhabelaensis is a species of sea snail, a marine gastropod mollusk in the family Ovulidae, the ovulids, cowry allies or false cowries.
