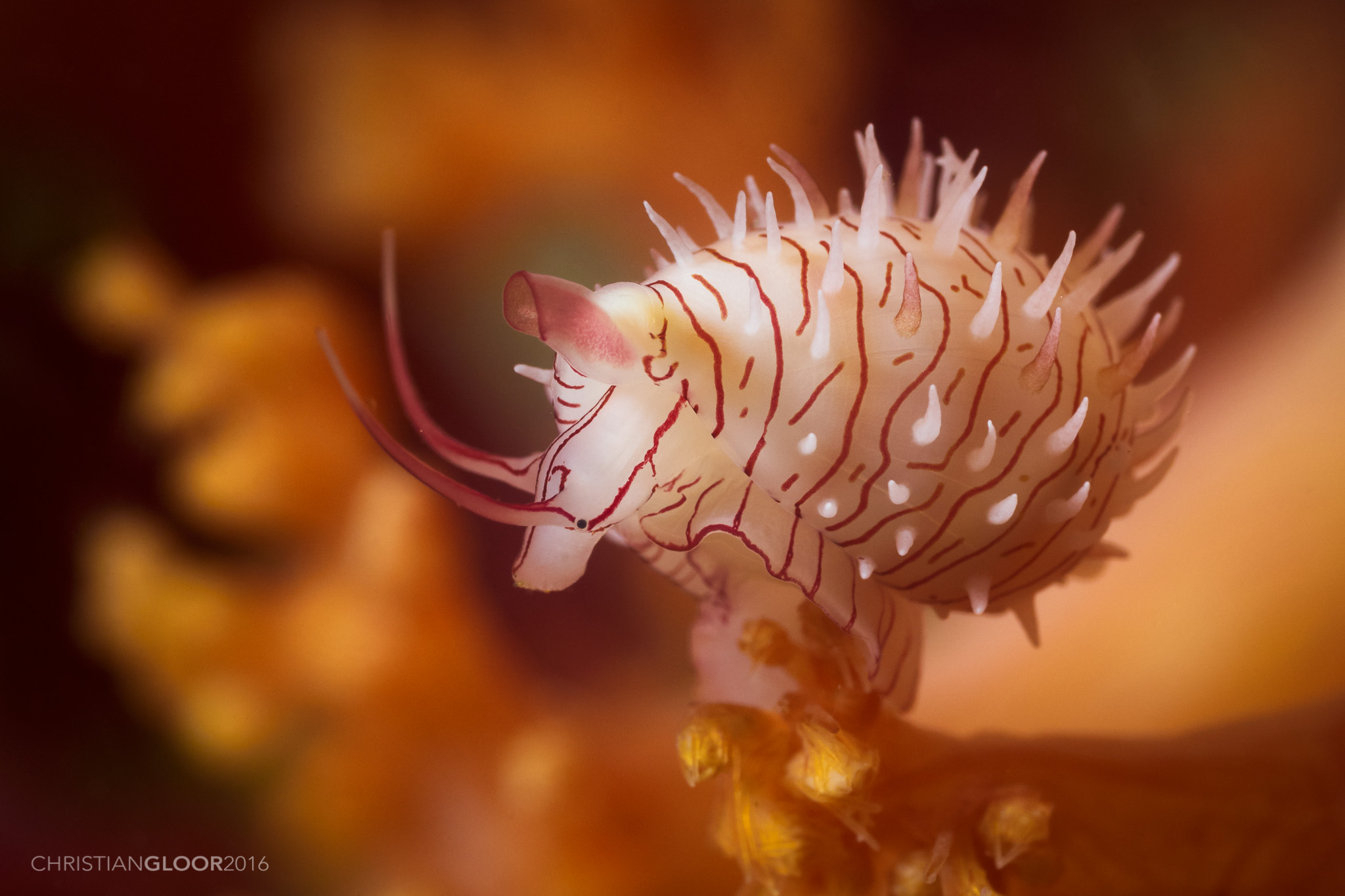

Scientific classification
- Kingdom: Animalia
- Phylum: Mollusca
- Class: Gastropoda
- Subclass: Caenogastropoda
- Order: Littorinimorpha
- Family: Ovulidae
- Genus: Habuprionovolva
- Species: H. basilia

Binomial name
- Habuprionovolva basilia (Cate, 1978)

= Habuprionovolva basilia =

Species of gastropod

Habuprionovolva basilia is a species of sea snail, a marine gastropod mollusk in the family Ovulidae, the ovulids, cowry allies or false cowries.
