= Dissona tosaensis =

Scientific classification
- Kingdom: Animalia
- Phylum: Mollusca
- Class: Gastropoda
- Subclass: Caenogastropoda
- Order: Littorinimorpha
- Family: Ovulidae
- Genus: Dissona
- Species: D. tosaensis

Binomial name
- Dissona tosaensis (Azuma & Cate, 1971)

Synonyms
- Dissona dolabra Cate, 1974; Primovula tosaensis Azuma & Cate, 1971

Species of gastropod

Dissona tosaensis is a species of sea snail in the family Ovulidae, the ovulids, cowry allies or false cowries.
