= Naviculavolva malaita =

Scientific classification
- Kingdom: Animalia
- Phylum: Mollusca
- Class: Gastropoda
- Subclass: Caenogastropoda
- Order: Littorinimorpha
- Family: Ovulidae
- Genus: Naviculavolva
- Species: N. malaita

Binomial name
- Naviculavolva malaita (Cate, 1976)

Species of gastropod

Naviculavolva malaita is a species of sea snail, a marine gastropod mollusk in the family Ovulidae, the ovulids, cowry allies or false cowries.
