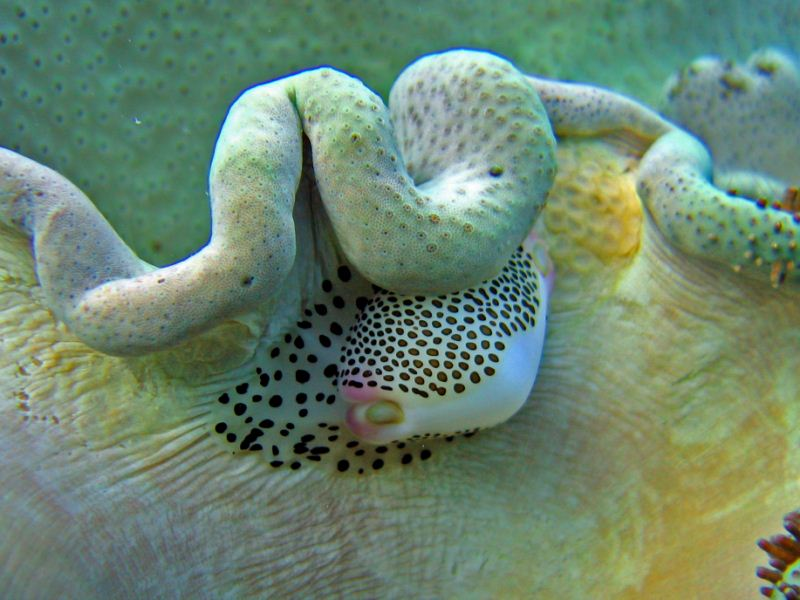
- Living Calpurnus verrucosus on soft coral Sacrophyton sp., Philippines

Scientific classification
- Kingdom: Animalia
- Phylum: Mollusca
- Class: Gastropoda
- Subclass: Caenogastropoda
- Order: Littorinimorpha
- Family: Ovulidae
- Genus: Calpurnus
- Species: C. verrucosus

Binomial name
- Calpurnus verrucosus (Linnaeus, 1758)

Synonyms
- Bulla verrucosa Linnaeus, 1758; Ovula perla Röding, 1798; Radius gibbus Rumphius, 1705

= Calpurnus verrucosus =

Species of gastropod

Calpurnus verrucosus, the Umbilical Egg Shell or Warty/Little Egg Cowry, is a species of sea snail, a cowry, a marine gastropod mollusk in the family Ovulidae, the cowries.

== Distribution ==
This species is mainly distributed in the tropical South East Africa and in the Western Pacific Ocean, in the waters along Madagascar, Mascarene Islands, Red Sea, Indonesia, Thailand and Philippines.

== Description ==
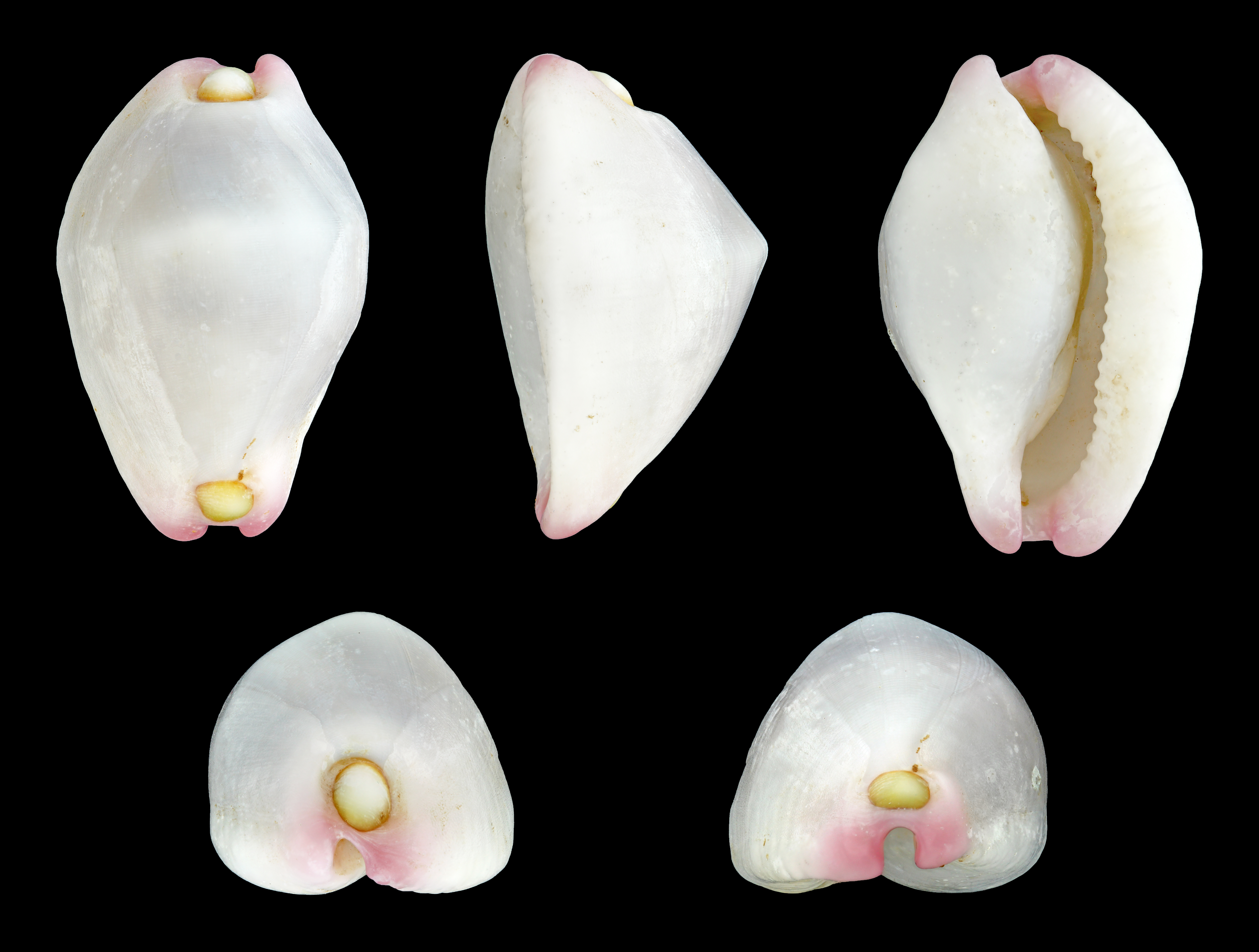
Shell of Calpurnus verrucosus

The shells of this species reach 10–40 millimetres (0.39–1.57 in) of length. This cowry is pure white, smooth and ovate, the base is flat and wide. The anterior and posterior extremities have a slight purple coloration, with a yellow circle at the edge of a depressed pustule (hence the Latin name of this species, verrucosus ). The mantle of the living cowries is white and completely covered by small brown spots. Also the foot is white with dark dots and can be extended widely around the base of the shell.

== Habitat ==
Living cowries can mainly be encountered in daylight under soft corals, sponges and rocks in shallow to deep waters at a depth of 20–50 m. They primarily feed on the polyps of Leather Corals (Sacrophyton and Lobophytum species, Alcyoniidae). At night they spread their mantles on the top of the soft coral and start grazing on the polyps.
