= Quasisimnia =

Scientific classification
- Kingdom: Animalia
- Phylum: Mollusca
- Class: Gastropoda
- Subclass: Caenogastropoda
- Order: Littorinimorpha
- Family: Ovulidae
- Subfamily: Simniinae
- Genus: Quasisimnia; Lorenz & Fehse, 2009

Genus of gastropods

Quasisimnia is a genus of sea snails, marine gastropod mollusks in the family Ovulidae.

== Species ==
Species within the genus Quasisimnia include:

- Quasisimnia hirasei (Pilsbry, 1913)
- Quasisimnia robertsoni (Cate, 1973)
