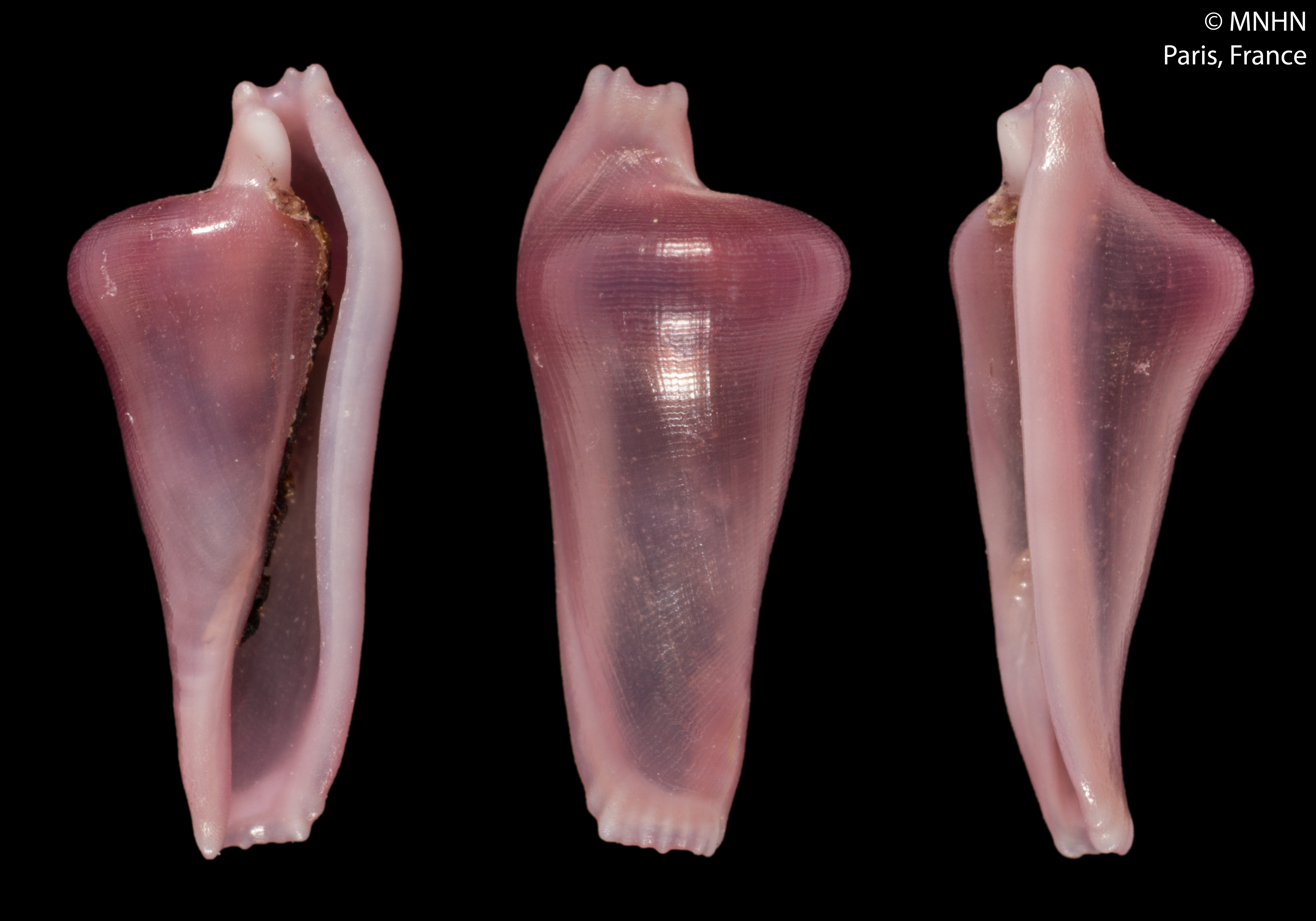
- Shell of Archivolva kahlbrocki (holotype at MNHN, Paris)

Scientific classification
- Kingdom: Animalia
- Phylum: Mollusca
- Class: Gastropoda
- Subclass: Caenogastropoda
- Order: Littorinimorpha
- Family: Ovulidae
- Genus: Archivolva
- Species: A. kahlbrocki

Binomial name
- Archivolva kahlbrocki Lorenz, 2009

= Archivolva kahlbrocki =

Species of gastropod

Archivolva kahlbrocki is a species of sea snail, a marine gastropod mollusc in the family Ovulidae, the ovulids, cowry allies or false cowries.
