= Aperiovula =

Scientific classification
- Kingdom: Animalia
- Phylum: Mollusca
- Class: Gastropoda
- Subclass: Caenogastropoda
- Order: Littorinimorpha
- Family: Ovulidae
- Genus: Aperiovula; Cate, 1973

Genus of gastropods

Aperiovula is a genus of sea snails, marine gastropod mollusks in the family Ovulidae, the ovulids, cowry allies or false cowries.

This genus has become a synonym of Pseudosimnia Schilder, 1927

== Species ==
Species within the genus Apriovula include:

- Aperiovula adriatica (Sowerby I, 1828): synonym of Pseudosimnia adriatica (G. B. Sowerby I, 1828)
- Aperiovula juanjosensii Perez & Gomez, 1987: synonym of Pseudosimnia juanjosensii (Pérez & Gómez, 1987) (original combination)
