= Carpiscula galearis =

Scientific classification
- Kingdom: Animalia
- Phylum: Mollusca
- Class: Gastropoda
- Subclass: Caenogastropoda
- Order: Littorinimorpha
- Family: Ovulidae
- Genus: Carpiscula
- Species: C. galearis

Binomial name
- Carpiscula galearis Cate, 1973

Species of gastropod

Carpiscula galearis is a species of sea snail, a marine gastropod mollusk in the family Ovulidae, the ovulids, cowry allies or false cowries.
