= Dissona reflexa =

Scientific classification
- Kingdom: Animalia
- Phylum: Mollusca
- Class: Gastropoda
- Subclass: Caenogastropoda
- Order: Littorinimorpha
- Family: Ovulidae
- Genus: Dissona
- Species: D. reflexa

Binomial name
- Dissona reflexa Cate, 1973

Species of gastropod

Dissona reflexa is a species of sea snail in the family Ovulidae, the ovulids, cowry allies or false cowries.
