= Habuprionovolva hervieri =

Scientific classification
- Kingdom: Animalia
- Phylum: Mollusca
- Class: Gastropoda
- Subclass: Caenogastropoda
- Order: Littorinimorpha
- Family: Ovulidae
- Genus: Habuprionovolva
- Species: H. hervieri

Binomial name
- Habuprionovolva hervieri (Hedley, 1899)

Synonyms
- Galera hervieri (Hedley, 1899); Ovula hervieri Hedley, 1899

Species of gastropod

Habuprionovolva hervieri is a species of sea snail, a marine gastropod mollusk in the family Ovulidae, the ovulids, cowry allies or false cowries.
