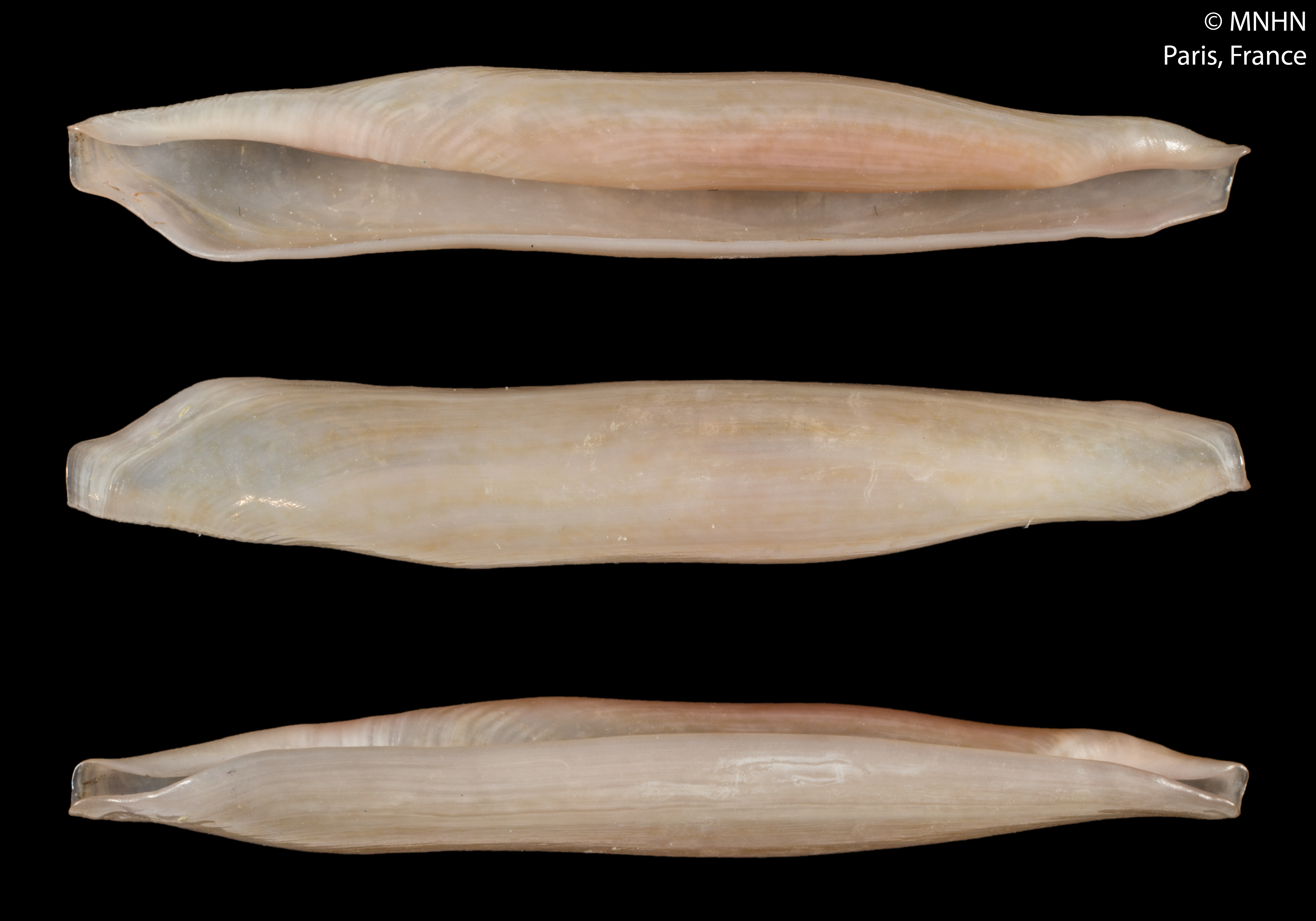
- Shell of Kuroshiovolva lacanientae (holotype at MNHN, Paris)

Scientific classification
- Kingdom: Animalia
- Phylum: Mollusca
- Class: Gastropoda
- Subclass: Caenogastropoda
- Order: Littorinimorpha
- Family: Ovulidae
- Genus: Kuroshiovolva
- Species: K. lacanientae

Binomial name
- Kuroshiovolva lacanientae Lorenz, 2009

= Kuroshiovolva lacanientae =

Species of gastropod

Kuroshiovolva lacanientae is a species of sea snail, a marine gastropod mollusk in the family Ovulidae, the ovulids, cowry allies or false cowries.

== Description ==
The length of the shell attains 29.5 mm.

== Distribution ==
This marine species occurs off the Philippines.
