= Hiatavolva rugosa =

Scientific classification
- Kingdom: Animalia
- Phylum: Mollusca
- Class: Gastropoda
- Subclass: Caenogastropoda
- Order: Littorinimorpha
- Family: Ovulidae
- Genus: Hiatavolva
- Species: H. rugosa

Binomial name
- Hiatavolva rugosa Cate & Azuma in Cate, 1973

Synonyms
- Hiata rugosa Cate & Azuma in Cate, 1973; Radius gracillimus Schilder, 1925

Species of gastropod

Hiatavolva rugosa is a species of sea snail, a marine gastropod mollusk in the family Ovulidae, the ovulids, cowry allies or false cowries.
