= Habuprionovolva umbilicata =

Scientific classification
- Kingdom: Animalia
- Phylum: Mollusca
- Class: Gastropoda
- Subclass: Caenogastropoda
- Order: Littorinimorpha
- Family: Ovulidae
- Genus: Habuprionovolva
- Species: H. umbilicata

Binomial name
- Habuprionovolva umbilicata (Sowerby II, 1848)

Synonyms
- Globovula nanhaiensis Ma Xiu-Tong, 1997

Species of gastropod

Habuprionovolva umbilicata is a species of sea snail, a marine gastropod mollusk in the family Ovulidae, the ovulids, cowry allies or false cowries.
