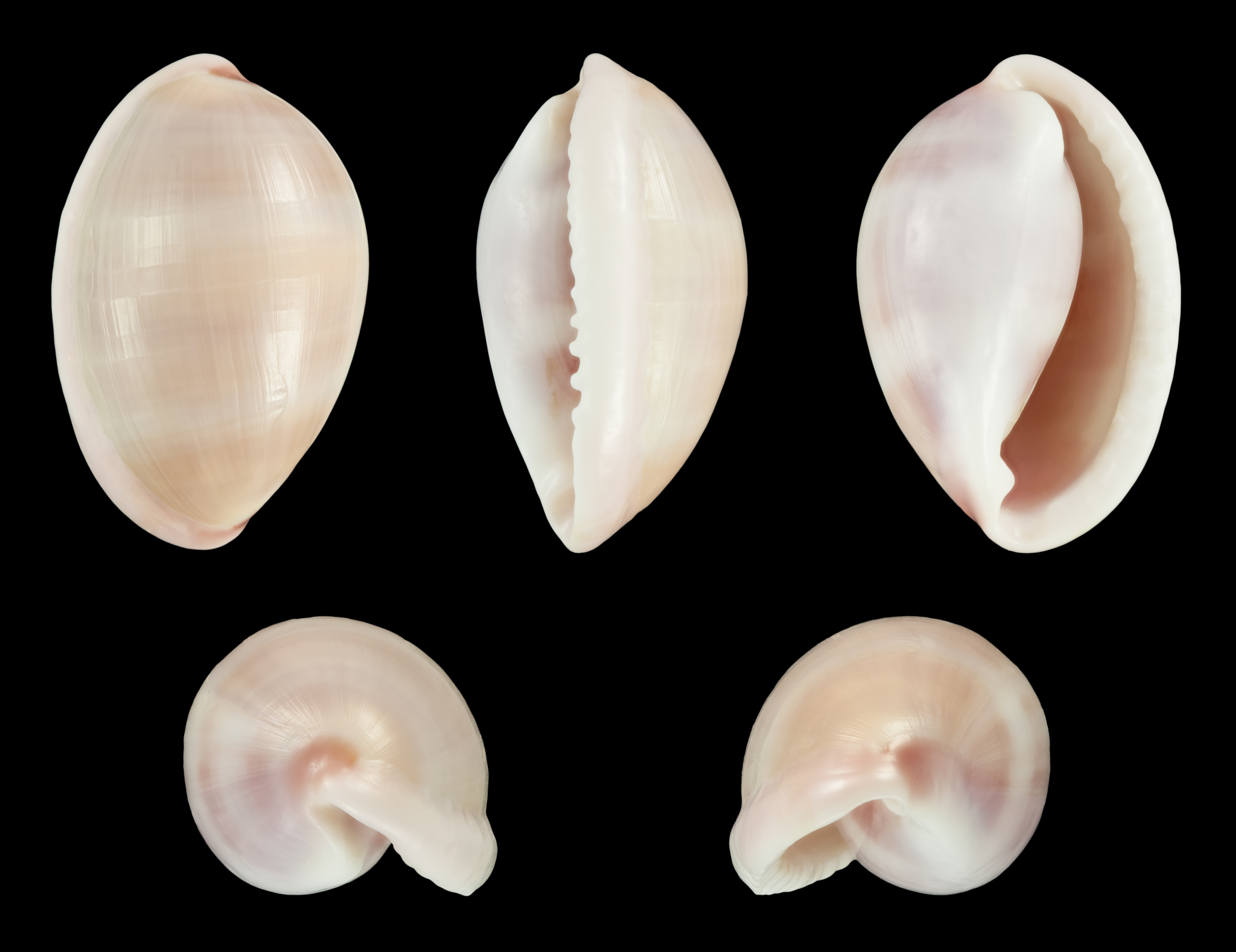

Scientific classification
- Kingdom: Animalia
- Phylum: Mollusca
- Class: Gastropoda
- Subclass: Caenogastropoda
- Order: Littorinimorpha
- Family: Ovulidae
- Genus: Prionovolva
- Species: P. brevis

Binomial name
- Prionovolva brevis (Sowerby I, 1828)

Synonyms
- Amphiperas pudica A. Adams, 1855; Ovula bullata Gould, 1861; Ovula pudica A. Adams, 1854; Ovulum breve Sowerby I, 1828; Ovulum fruticum Reeve, 1865; Ovulum nubeculatum Sowerby II in A. Adams & Reeve, 1848; Primovula fructicum (Reeve, 1865); Primovula fruticum (Reeve, 1865); Prionovolva castanea Cate, 1978; Prionovolva fruticum (Reeve, 1865); Prionovolva nivea Cate, 1974; Prionovolva nubeculata (Sowerby II in A. Adams & Reeve, 1848); Prionovolva pudica (A. Adams, 1855); Prionovolva pudica wilsoniana Cate, 1973; Prionovolva wilsoniana Cate, 1973; Pseudosimnia (Diminovula) fruticum (Reeve, 1865)

= Prionovolva brevis =

Species of gastropod

Prionovolva brevis is a species of sea snail, a marine gastropod mollusk in the family Ovulidae, the ovulids, cowry allies or false cowries.

== Description ==
The shell size varies between 6 mm and 22 mm.

== Distribution ==
This species is distributed in the Pacific Ocean along Japan, Taiwan, the Philippines, Papua New Guinea and New South Wales, Australia and in the Indian Ocean along Somalia.
