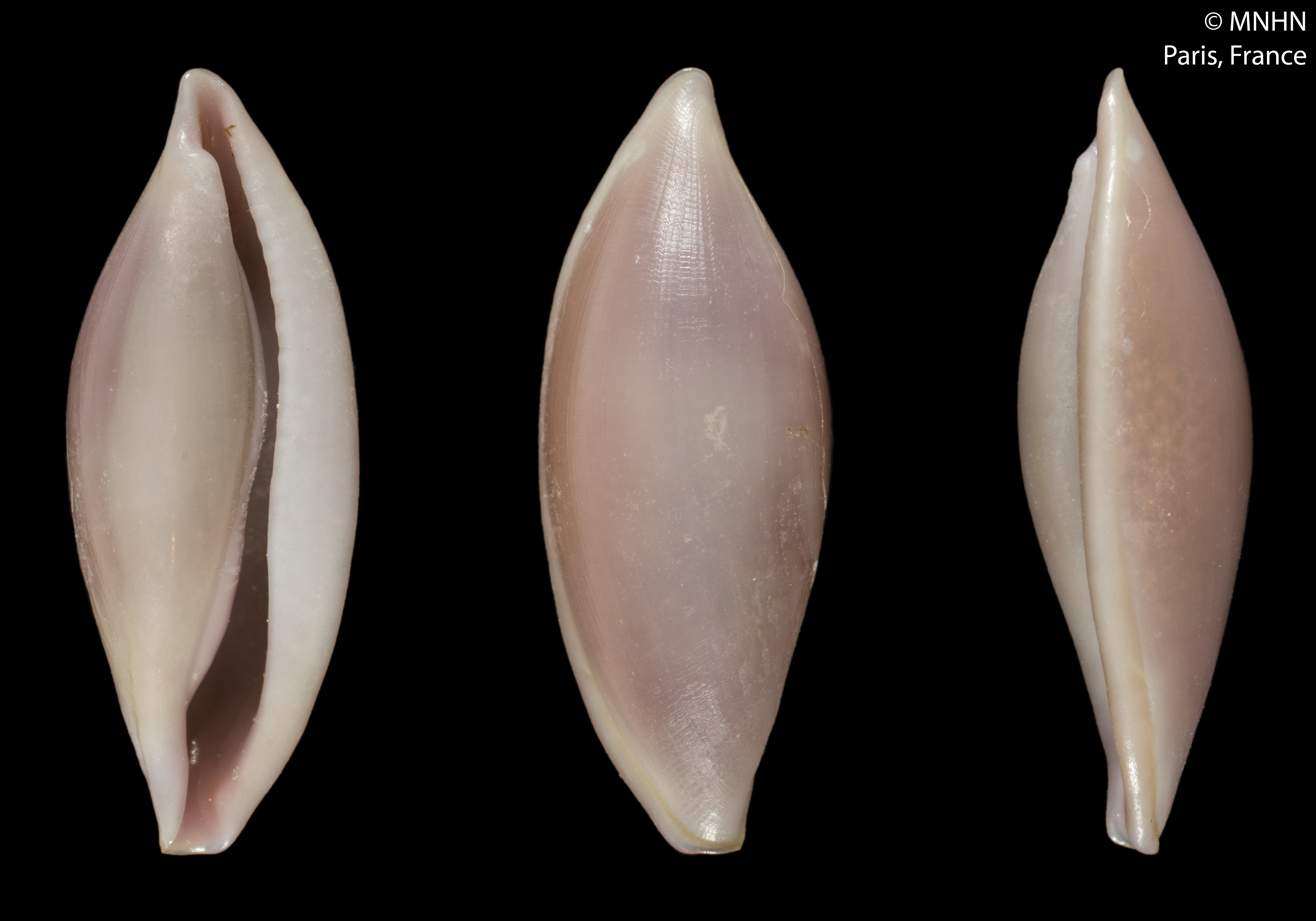
- Shell of Naviculavolva debelius (holotype at MNHN, Paris)

Scientific classification
- Kingdom: Animalia
- Phylum: Mollusca
- Class: Gastropoda
- Subclass: Caenogastropoda
- Order: Littorinimorpha
- Superfamily: Cypraeoidea
- Family: Ovulidae
- Subfamily: Simniinae
- Genus: Naviculavolva; Lorenz & Fehse, 2009

Type species
- Cymbovula malaita C. N. Cate, 1976

= Naviculavolva =

Genus of gastropods

Naviculavolva is a genus of sea snails, marine gastropod mollusks in the subfamily Simniinae of the family Ovulidae.

== Species ==
Species within the genus Naviculavolva include:

- Naviculavolva debelius Lorenz & Fehse, 2011
- Naviculavolva deflexa (G.B. Sowerby II, 1848)
- Naviculavolva elegans Fehse, 2009
- Naviculavolva kurziana (Cate, 1976)
- Naviculavolva malaita (Cate, 1976)
- Naviculavolva massierorum (Fehse, 1999)
