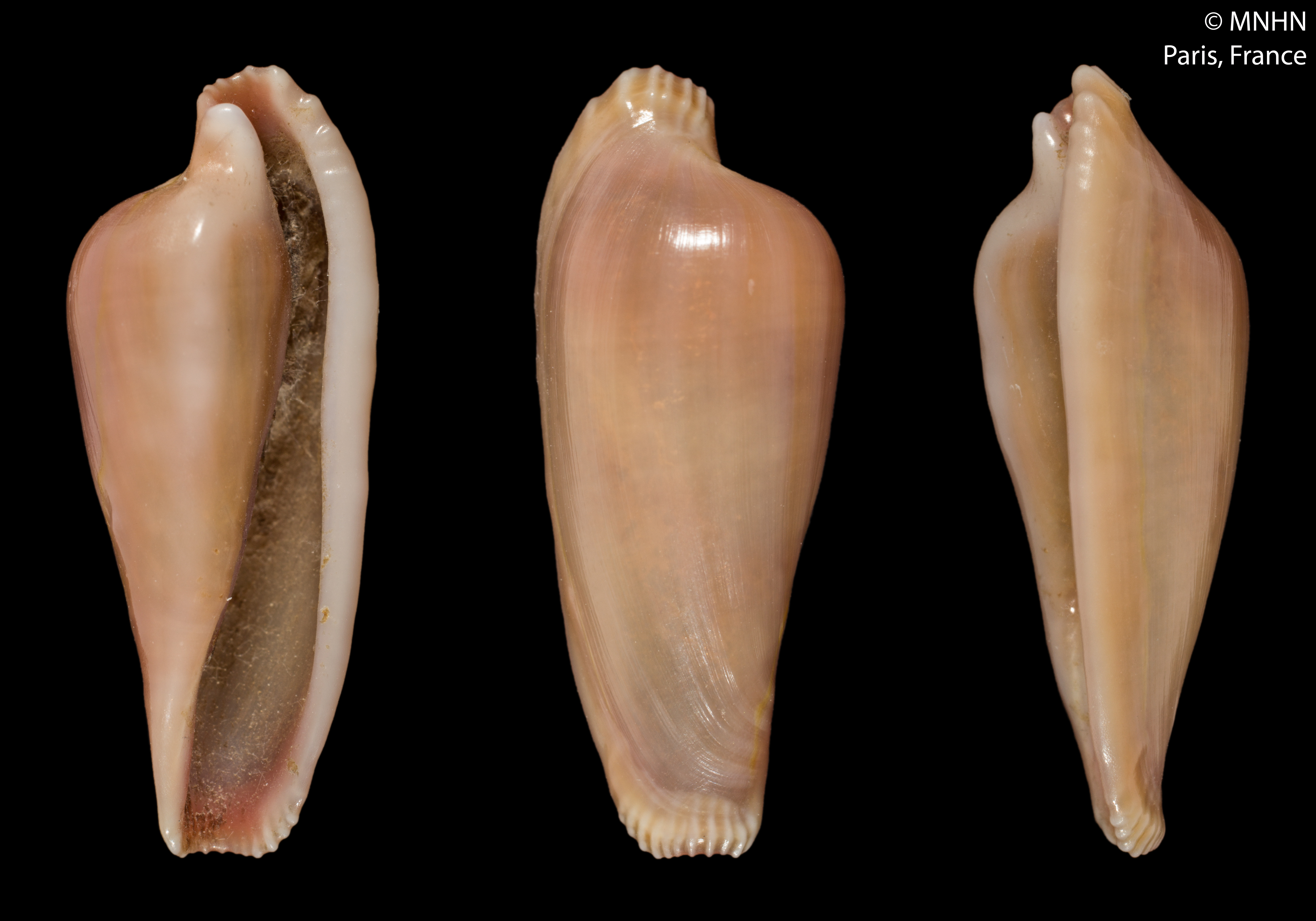
- Shell of Archivolva lissenungensis (holotype at MNHN, Paris)

Scientific classification
- Kingdom: Animalia
- Phylum: Mollusca
- Class: Gastropoda
- Subclass: Caenogastropoda
- Order: Littorinimorpha
- Family: Ovulidae
- Genus: Archivolva
- Species: A. lissenungensis

Binomial name
- Archivolva lissenungensis (Lorenz, 2005)

Synonyms
- Dentiovula lissenungensis Lorenz, 2005

= Archivolva lissenungensis =

Species of gastropod

Archivolva lissenungensis is a species of sea snail, a marine gastropod mollusc in the family Ovulidae, the ovulids, cowry allies or false cowries.
