= Archivolva clava =

Scientific classification
- Kingdom: Animalia
- Phylum: Mollusca
- Class: Gastropoda
- Subclass: Caenogastropoda
- Order: Littorinimorpha
- Family: Ovulidae
- Genus: Archivolva
- Species: A. clava

Binomial name
- Archivolva clava (Habe, 1991)

Species of gastropod

Archivolva clava is a species of sea snail, a marine gastropod mollusc in the family Ovulidae, the ovulids, cowry allies or false cowries.
