= Hiatavolva coarctata =

Scientific classification
- Kingdom: Animalia
- Phylum: Mollusca
- Class: Gastropoda
- Subclass: Caenogastropoda
- Order: Littorinimorpha
- Family: Ovulidae
- Genus: Hiatavolva
- Species: H. coarctata

Binomial name
- Hiatavolva coarctata (Sowerby II in A. Adams & Reeve, 1848)

Synonyms
- Aclyvolva vulgaris Ma Xiu-tong, 1986; Hiata coarctata (A. Adams & Reeve, 1848); Ovulum coarctatum A. Adams & Reeve, 1848; Primovula horimasarui Cate & Azuma, 1971

Species of gastropod

Hiatavolva coarctata is a species of sea snail, a marine gastropod mollusk in the family Ovulidae, the ovulids, cowry allies or false cowries.
