= Carpiscula bullata =

Scientific classification
- Kingdom: Animalia
- Phylum: Mollusca
- Class: Gastropoda
- Subclass: Caenogastropoda
- Order: Littorinimorpha
- Family: Ovulidae
- Genus: Carpiscula
- Species: C. bullata

Binomial name
- Carpiscula bullata (Sowerby II in A. Adams & Reeve, 1848)

Synonyms
- Ovulum bullatum Sowerby II in A. Adams & Reeve, 1848

Species of gastropod

Carpiscula bullata is a species of sea snail, a marine gastropod mollusk in the family Ovulidae (the ovulids, cowry allies or false cowries).
