= Globovula sphaera =

Scientific classification
- Kingdom: Animalia
- Phylum: Mollusca
- Class: Gastropoda
- Subclass: Caenogastropoda
- Order: Littorinimorpha
- Family: Ovulidae
- Genus: Globovula
- Species: G. sphaera

Binomial name
- Globovula sphaera Cate, 1973

Species of gastropod

Globovula sphaera is a species of sea snail, a marine gastropod mollusk in the family Ovulidae, the ovulids, cowry allies or false cowries.
