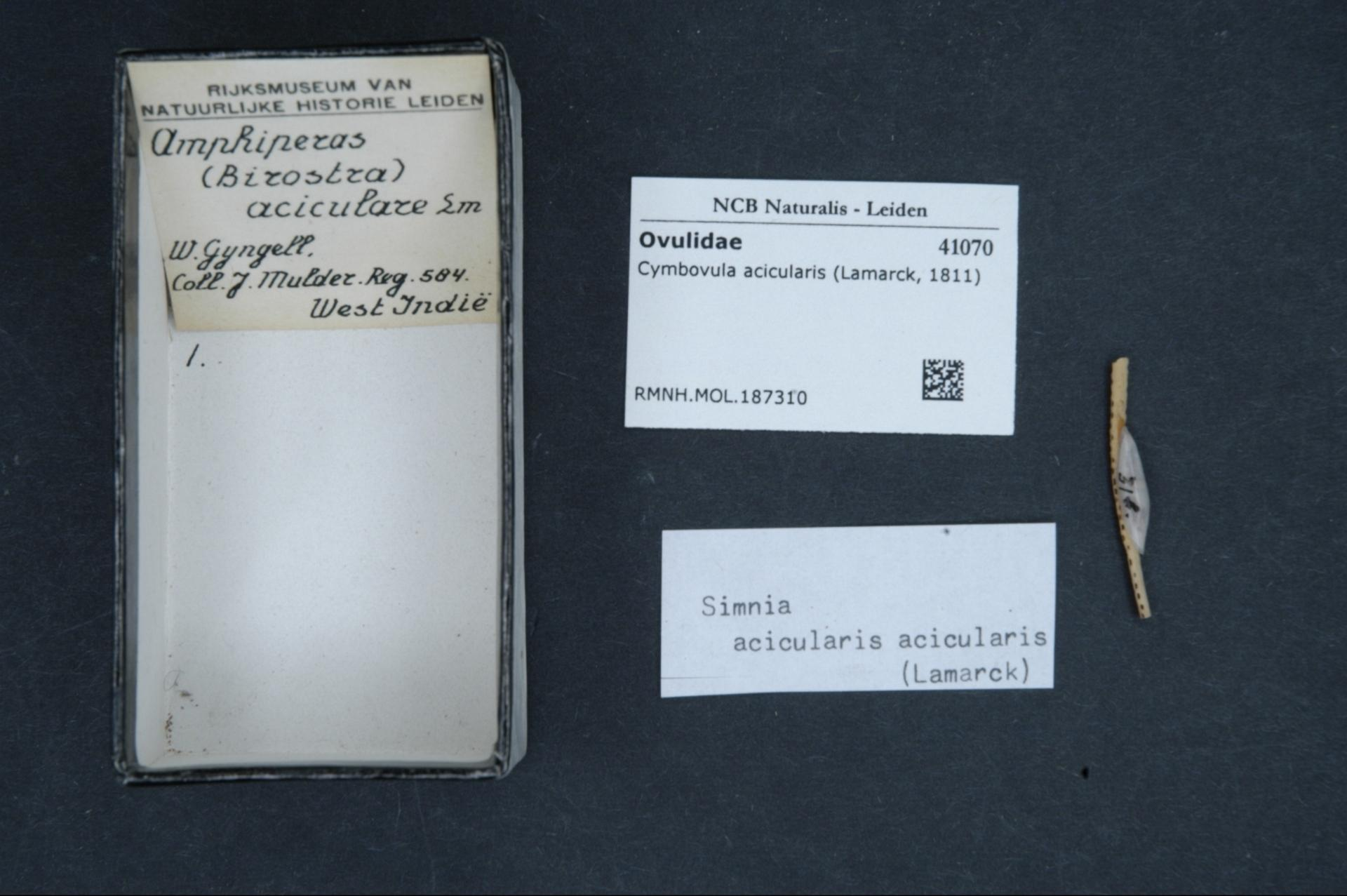

Scientific classification
- Kingdom: Animalia
- Phylum: Mollusca
- Class: Gastropoda
- Subclass: Caenogastropoda
- Order: Littorinimorpha
- Family: Ovulidae
- Genus: Cymbovula
- Species: C. acicularis

Binomial name
- Cymbovula acicularis (Lamarck, 1810)

Synonyms
- Bulla secale Dillwyn, 1817; Cymbovula bahamensis (Cate, 1973); Cymbula acicularis (Lamarck, 1810); Cymbula bahamensis Cate, 1973 (original combination); Neosimnia acicularis (Lamarck, 1811); Ovula acicularis Lamarck, 1810; Ovulum acicularis (Lamarck, 1811); Radius acicularis (Lamarck, 1811); Simnia acicularis (Lamarck, 1811); Volva acicularis (Lamarck, 1811)

= Cymbovula acicularis =

Species of gastropod

Cymbovula acicularis is a species of sea snail, a marine gastropod mollusk in the family Ovulidae, the ovulids, cowry allies or false cowries.

== Distribution ==
This marine species occurs in the Caribbean Sea off Guadeloupe.

== Description ==
The maximum recorded shell length is 17 mm.

== Habitat ==
Minimum recorded depth is 0.3 m. Maximum recorded depth is 60 m.
