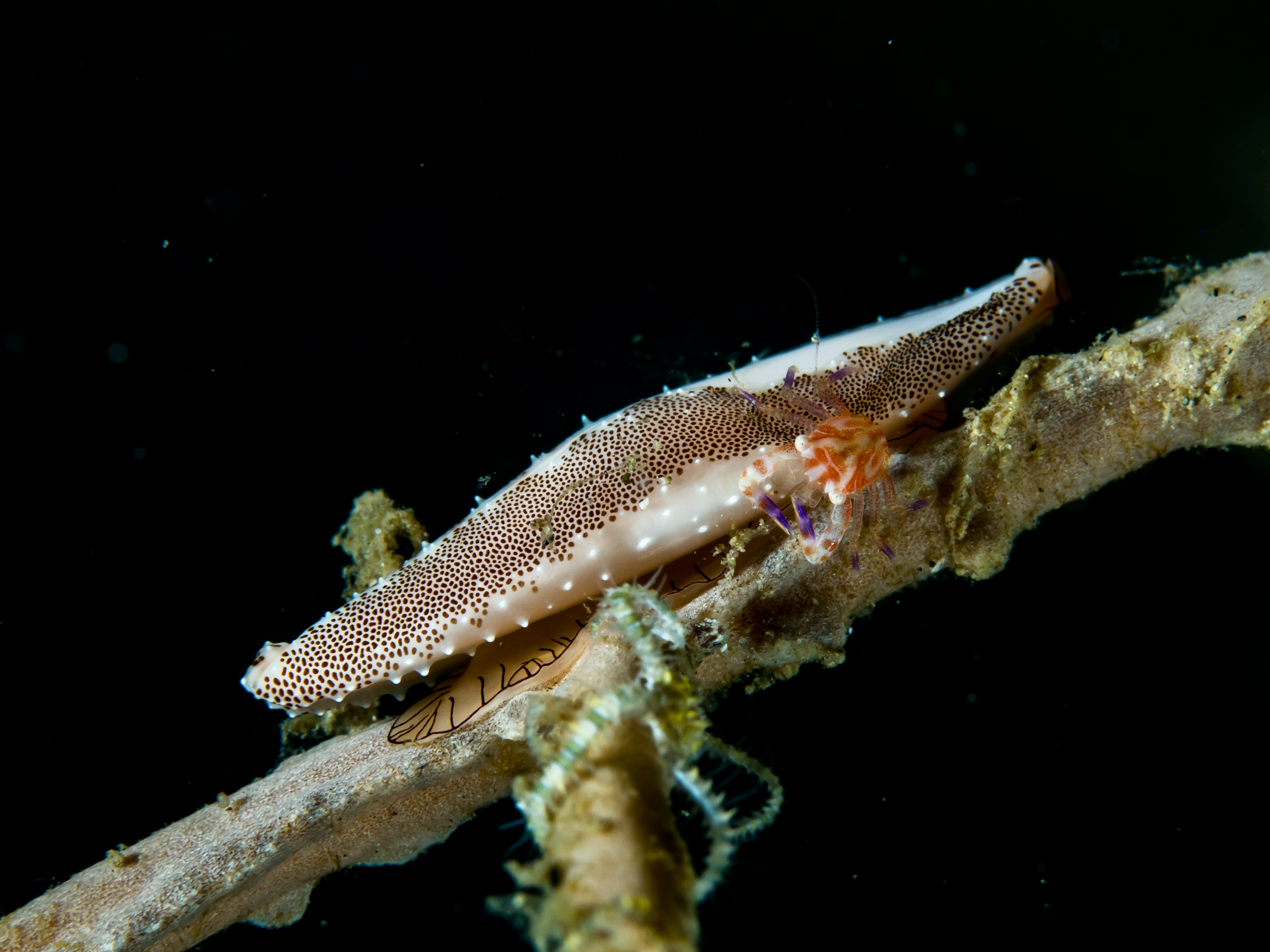
- Depressed spindle cowrie (Hiatavolva depressa)

Scientific classification
- Kingdom: Animalia
- Phylum: Mollusca
- Class: Gastropoda
- Subclass: Caenogastropoda
- Order: Littorinimorpha
- Family: Ovulidae
- Genus: Hiatavolva
- Species: H. depressa

Binomial name
- Hiatavolva depressa (Sowerby III, 1889)

Synonyms
- Hiata depressa (Sowerby III, 1875); Ovulum depressum Sowerby III, 1875; Phenacovolva praenominata Iredale, 1935

= Hiatavolva depressa =

Species of gastropod

Hiatavolva depressa is a species of sea snail, a marine gastropod mollusc in the family Ovulidae, the ovulids, cowry allies or false cowries.
