= Prionovolva choshiensis =

Scientific classification
- Kingdom: Animalia
- Phylum: Mollusca
- Class: Gastropoda
- Subclass: Caenogastropoda
- Order: Littorinimorpha
- Family: Ovulidae
- Genus: Prionovolva
- Species: P. choshiensis

Binomial name
- Prionovolva choshiensis (Cate, 1973)

Synonyms
- Galera choshiensis Cate, 1973

Species of gastropod

Prionovolva choshiensis is a species of sea snail, a marine gastropod mollusk in the family Ovulidae, the ovulids, cowry allies or false cowries.
