= Naviculavolva elegans =

Scientific classification
- Kingdom: Animalia
- Phylum: Mollusca
- Class: Gastropoda
- Subclass: Caenogastropoda
- Order: Littorinimorpha
- Family: Ovulidae
- Genus: Naviculavolva
- Species: N. elegans

Binomial name
- Naviculavolva elegans Fehse, 2009

Species of gastropod

Naviculavolva elegans is a species of sea snail, a marine gastropod mollusk in the family Ovulidae, the ovulids, cowry allies or false cowries.
