= Carpiscula procera =

Scientific classification
- Kingdom: Animalia
- Phylum: Mollusca
- Class: Gastropoda
- Subclass: Caenogastropoda
- Order: Littorinimorpha
- Family: Ovulidae
- Genus: Carpiscula
- Species: C. procera

Binomial name
- Carpiscula procera Fehse, 2009

Species of gastropod

Carpiscula procera is a species of sea snail, a marine gastropod mollusc in the family Ovulidae, the ovulids, cowry allies or false cowries.
