= Simnialena acuminata =

Scientific classification
- Kingdom: Animalia
- Phylum: Mollusca
- Class: Gastropoda
- Subclass: Caenogastropoda
- Order: Littorinimorpha
- Family: Ovulidae
- Genus: Simnialena
- Species: S. acuminata

Binomial name
- Simnialena acuminata (Sowerby II in A. Adams & Reeve, 1848)

Synonyms
- Ovulum acuminatum A. Adams & Reeve, 1848; Phenacovolva acuminata (A. Adams & Reeve, 1848)

Species of gastropod

Simnialena acuminata is a species of sea snail, a marine gastropod mollusk in the family Ovulidae, the ovulids, cowry allies or false cowries.
