= Kuroshiovolva shingoi =

Scientific classification
- Kingdom: Animalia
- Phylum: Mollusca
- Class: Gastropoda
- Subclass: Caenogastropoda
- Order: Littorinimorpha
- Family: Ovulidae
- Genus: Kuroshiovolva
- Species: K. shingoi

Binomial name
- Kuroshiovolva shingoi Azuma & Cate, 1971

Species of gastropod

Kuroshiovolva shingoi is a species of sea snail, a marine gastropod mollusk in the family Ovulidae, the ovulids, cowry allies or false cowries.
