= Quasisimnia hirasei =

Scientific classification
- Kingdom: Animalia
- Phylum: Mollusca
- Class: Gastropoda
- Subclass: Caenogastropoda
- Order: Littorinimorpha
- Family: Ovulidae
- Genus: Quasisimnia
- Species: Q. hirasei

Binomial name
- Quasisimnia hirasei (Pilsbry, 1913)

Synonyms
- Ovula hirasei Pilsbry, 1913; Phenacovolva greenbergae Cate, 1974; Phenacovolva hirasei (Pilsbry, 1913)

Species of gastropod

Quasisimnia hirasei is a species of sea snail, a marine gastropod mollusk in the family Ovulidae, the ovulids, cowry allies or false cowries.
