= Cymbovula bebae =

Scientific classification
- Kingdom: Animalia
- Phylum: Mollusca
- Class: Gastropoda
- Subclass: Caenogastropoda
- Order: Littorinimorpha
- Family: Ovulidae
- Genus: Cymbovula
- Species: C. bebae

Binomial name
- Cymbovula bebae Fernandes & Ròlan, 1995

Species of gastropod

Cymbovula bebae is a species of sea snail in the family Ovulidae, the ovulids, cowry allies or false cowries.
