= Quasisimnia robertsoni =

Scientific classification
- Kingdom: Animalia
- Phylum: Mollusca
- Class: Gastropoda
- Subclass: Caenogastropoda
- Order: Littorinimorpha
- Family: Ovulidae
- Genus: Quasisimnia
- Species: Q. robertsoni

Binomial name
- Quasisimnia robertsoni (Cate, 1973)

Synonyms
- Aperiovula robertsoni Cate, 1973

Species of gastropod

Quasisimnia robertsoni is a species of sea snail, a marine gastropod mollusk in the family Ovulidae, the ovulids, cowry allies or false cowries.
