= Rotaovula hirohitoi =

Scientific classification
- Kingdom: Animalia
- Phylum: Mollusca
- Class: Gastropoda
- Subclass: Caenogastropoda
- Order: Littorinimorpha
- Family: Ovulidae
- Genus: Rotaovula
- Species: R. hirohitoi

Binomial name
- Rotaovula hirohitoi Cate & Azuma in Cate, 1973

Species of gastropod

Rotaovula hirohitoi is a species of sea snail, a marine gastropod mollusk in the family Ovulidae, the ovulids, cowry allies or false cowries.
