= Rotaovula septemmacula =

Scientific classification
- Kingdom: Animalia
- Phylum: Mollusca
- Class: Gastropoda
- Subclass: Caenogastropoda
- Order: Littorinimorpha
- Family: Ovulidae
- Genus: Rotaovula
- Species: R. septemmacula

Binomial name
- Rotaovula septemmacula (Azuma, 1974)

Synonyms
- Crenavolva conspicua Cate, 1975

Species of gastropod

Rotaovula septemmacula is a species of sea snail, a marine gastropod mollusk in the family Ovulidae, the ovulids, cowry allies or false cowries.
