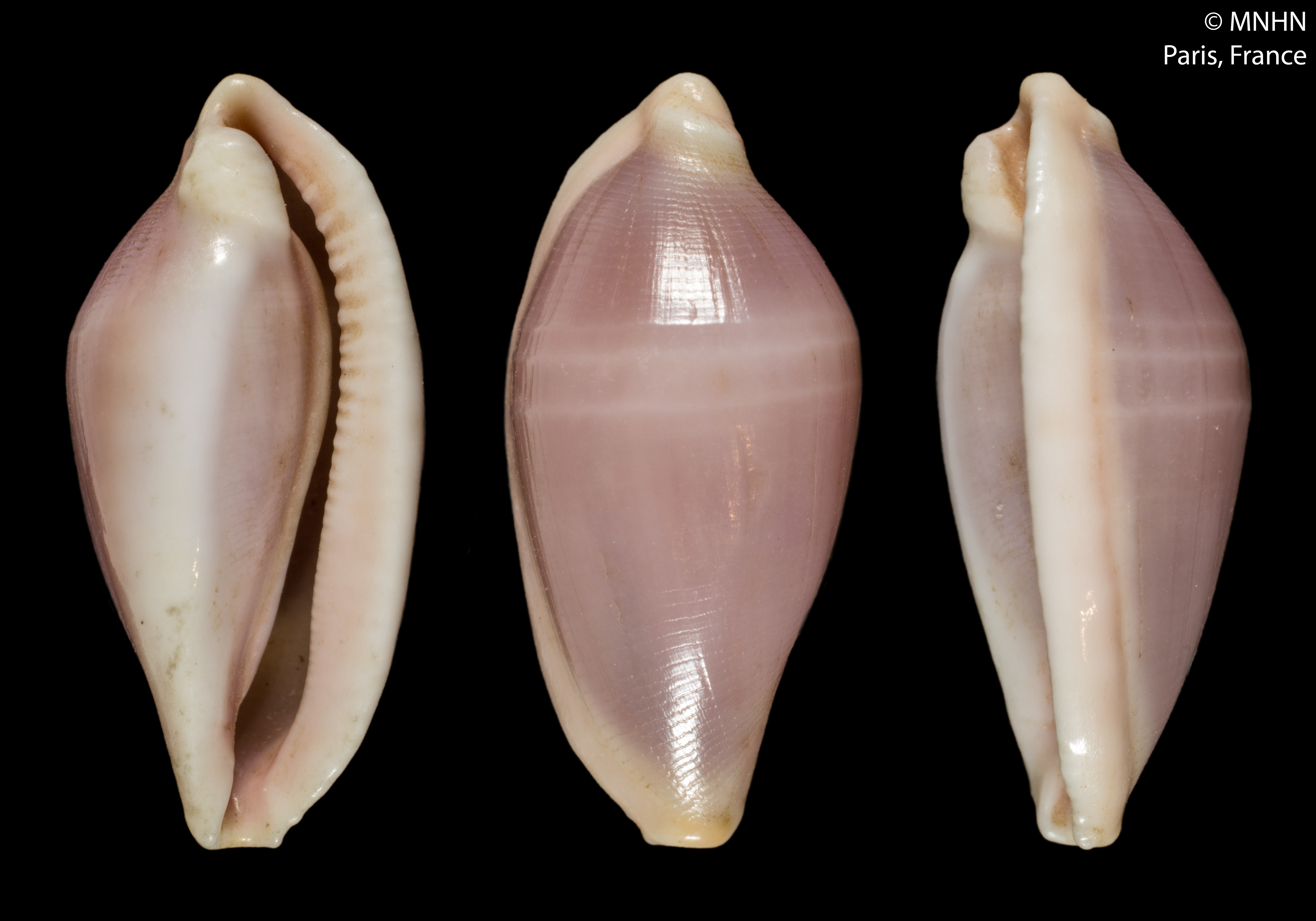
- Shell of Sandalia meyeriana (holotype at MNHN, Paris)

Scientific classification
- Kingdom: Animalia
- Phylum: Mollusca
- Class: Gastropoda
- Subclass: Caenogastropoda
- Order: Littorinimorpha
- Family: Ovulidae
- Genus: Sandalia
- Species: S. meyeriana

Binomial name
- Sandalia meyeriana (Cate, 1973)

Synonyms
- Aperiovula meyeriana Cate, 1973; Aperiovula takae Cate, 1973; Aperiovula takaeopsis Cate, 1978; Aperiovula testudiana C. N. Cate, 1978 ·; Crenavolva testudiana Cate, 1978

= Sandalia meyeriana =

Species of gastropod

Sandalia meyeriana is a species of sea snail, a marine gastropod mollusk in the family Ovulidae, the ovulids, cowry allies or false cowries, commonly known as the ovulids, cowry allies, or false cowries.

== Description ==
The shell of Sandalia meyeriana is relatively small, with a maximum length of about 14.2 mm. The shell is characterized by its elongated, ovate shape and intricate patterns. The aperture is narrow, and the outer lip is thin and slightly flared. The species exhibits a high degree of morphological variation, which is common among marine gastropods and is influenced by environmental factors such as water temperature, salinity, and substrate type.

== Distribution ==
Sandalia meyeriana is found in the marine waters off Japan. The species inhabits shallow to moderately deep waters, typically at depths ranging from 10 to 50 meters.
