= Hiatavolva =

Scientific classification
- Kingdom: Animalia
- Phylum: Mollusca
- Class: Gastropoda
- Subclass: Caenogastropoda
- Order: Littorinimorpha
- Family: Ovulidae
- Genus: Hiatavolva; Cate, 1973

Genus of gastropods

Hiatavolva is a genus of predatory sea snails, marine gastropod mollusks in the family Ovulidae.

== Species ==
Species within the genus Hiatavolva include:

- Hiatavolva coarctata (Sowerby II in A. Adams & Reeve, 1848)
- Hiatavolva depressa (Sowerby III, 1889)
- Hiatavolva rugosa Cate & Azuma in Cate, 1973
