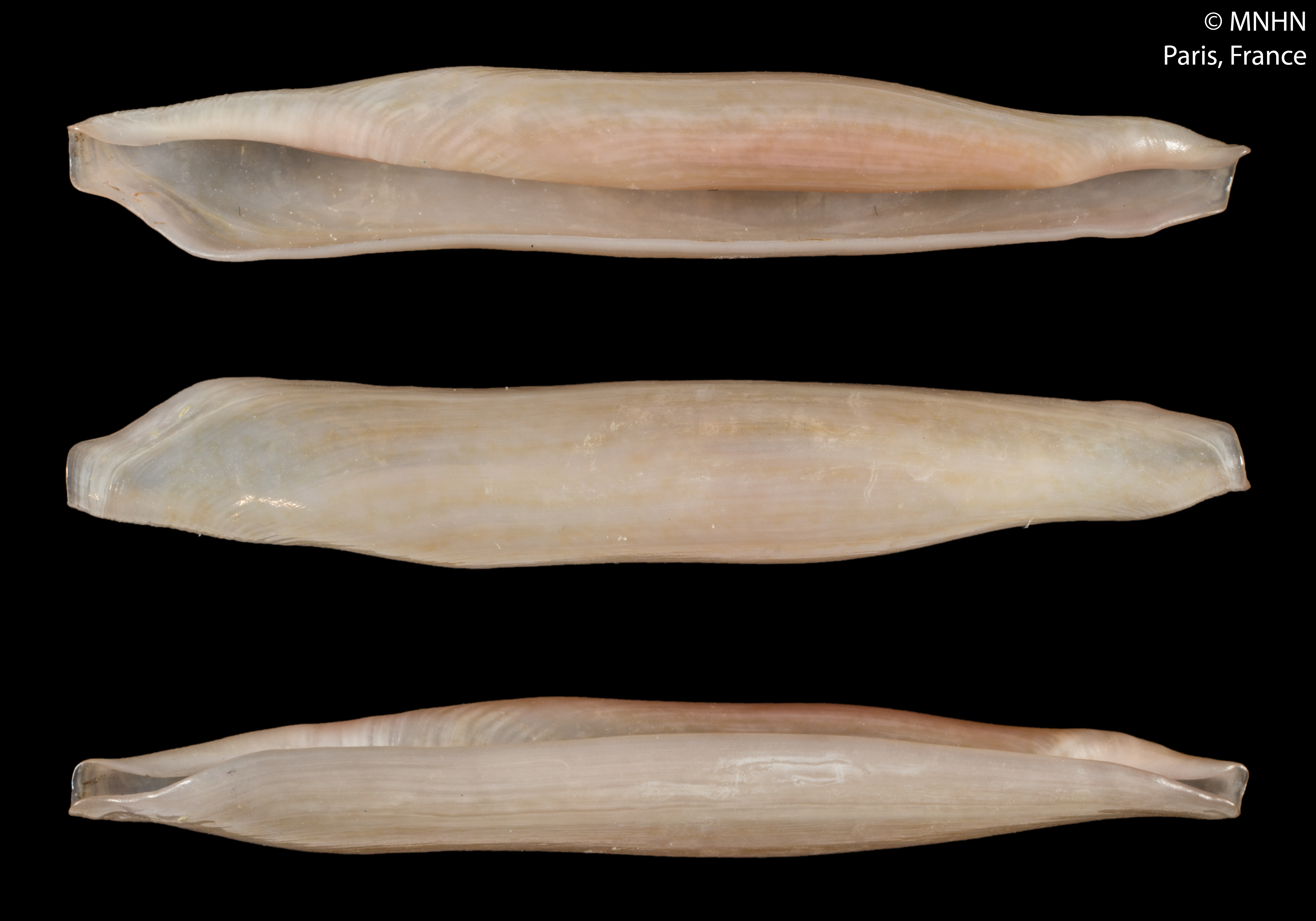
- Shell of Kuroshiovolva lacanientae

Scientific classification
- Kingdom: Animalia
- Phylum: Mollusca
- Class: Gastropoda
- Subclass: Caenogastropoda
- Order: Littorinimorpha
- Superfamily: Cypraeoidea
- Family: Ovulidae
- Genus: Kuroshiovolva; Shuto, 1965

Type species
- Daphnella fuscobalteata Azuma & Cate, 1971

Species
- See text

= Kuroshiovolva =

Genus of gastropods

Kuroshiovolva is a genus of sea snails, marine gastropod mollusks in the subfamily Aclyvolvinae of the family Ovulidae.

== Species ==
Species within the genus Kuroshiovolva include:

- Kuroshiovolva lacanientae Lorenz, 2009
- Kuroshiovolva shingoi Azuma & Cate, 1971
