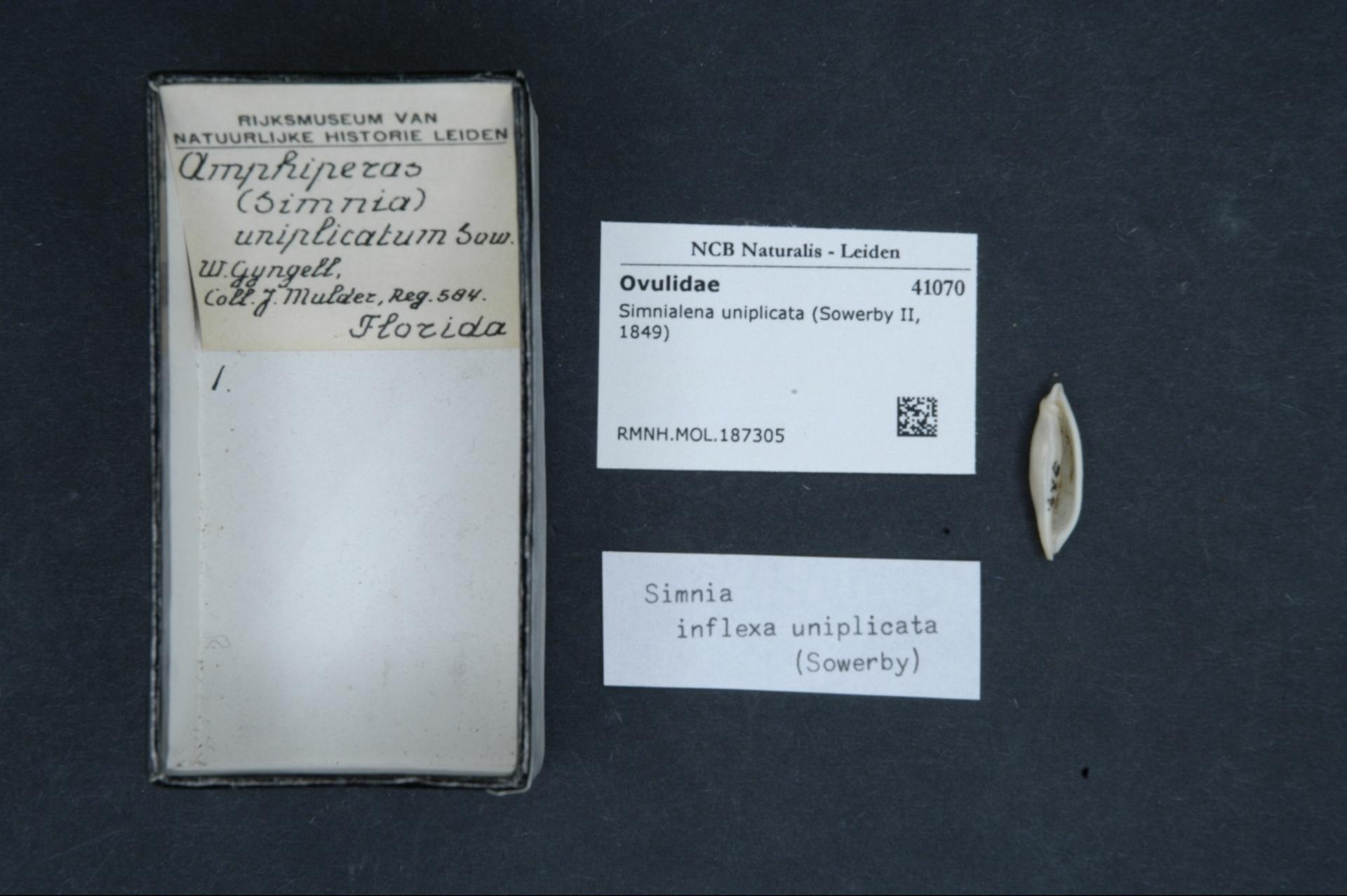

Scientific classification
- Kingdom: Animalia
- Phylum: Mollusca
- Class: Gastropoda
- Subclass: Caenogastropoda
- Order: Littorinimorpha
- Family: Ovulidae
- Subfamily: Simniinae
- Genus: Simnialena; Cate, 1973

= Simnialena =

Genus of gastropods

Simnialena is a genus of sea snails, marine gastropod mollusks in the family Ovulidae.

== Species ==
Species within the genus Simnialena include:

- Simnialena acuminata (Sowerby II in A. Adams & Reeve, 1848)
- Simnialena ilhabelaensis Fehse, 2001
- Simnialena marferula Cate, 1973
- Simnialena rufa (Sowerby II, 1832)
- Simnialena uniplicata (Sowerby II, 1849)
