= Testudovolva nebula =

Scientific classification
- Kingdom: Animalia
- Phylum: Mollusca
- Class: Gastropoda
- Subclass: Caenogastropoda
- Order: Littorinimorpha
- Family: Ovulidae
- Genus: Testudovolva
- Species: T. nebula

Binomial name
- Testudovolva nebula (Azuma & Cate, 1971)

Synonyms
- Prionovolva nebula Azuma & Cate, 1971

Species of gastropod

Testudovolva nebula is a species of sea snail, a marine gastropod mollusk in the family Ovulidae, from which the ovulids, cowry allies or false cowries also belong to.

== Description ==
This species ranges in size from 4-12 mm long, with a width around 8mm. They appear mottled pink/red and white, with small protrusions. The shell is roundly humped on the dorsal side. After death, their shells can be a number of colors: off-white, orange, pink, red, purple; and patterns: striated, spotted.

== Distribution and Habitat ==
Testudovolva nebula can be found off the coasts of Korea, Japan, Taiwan, Philippines, and Indonesia. They live around 160 m below the surface of the water, on Dendronephthya.
