= Cuspivolva queenslandica =

Scientific classification
- Kingdom: Animalia
- Phylum: Mollusca
- Class: Gastropoda
- Subclass: Caenogastropoda
- Order: Littorinimorpha
- Family: Ovulidae
- Genus: Cuspivolva
- Species: C. queenslandica

Binomial name
- Cuspivolva queenslandica (Cate, 1974)

Synonyms
- Cymbovula cylindrica Ma Xiu-Tong, 1997; Cymbovula guandongensis Ma Xiu-Tong, 1997; Cymbovula segaliana Cate, 1976

Species of gastropod

Cuspivolva queenslandica is a species of sea snail in the family Ovulidae, the ovulids, cowry allies or false cowries.
