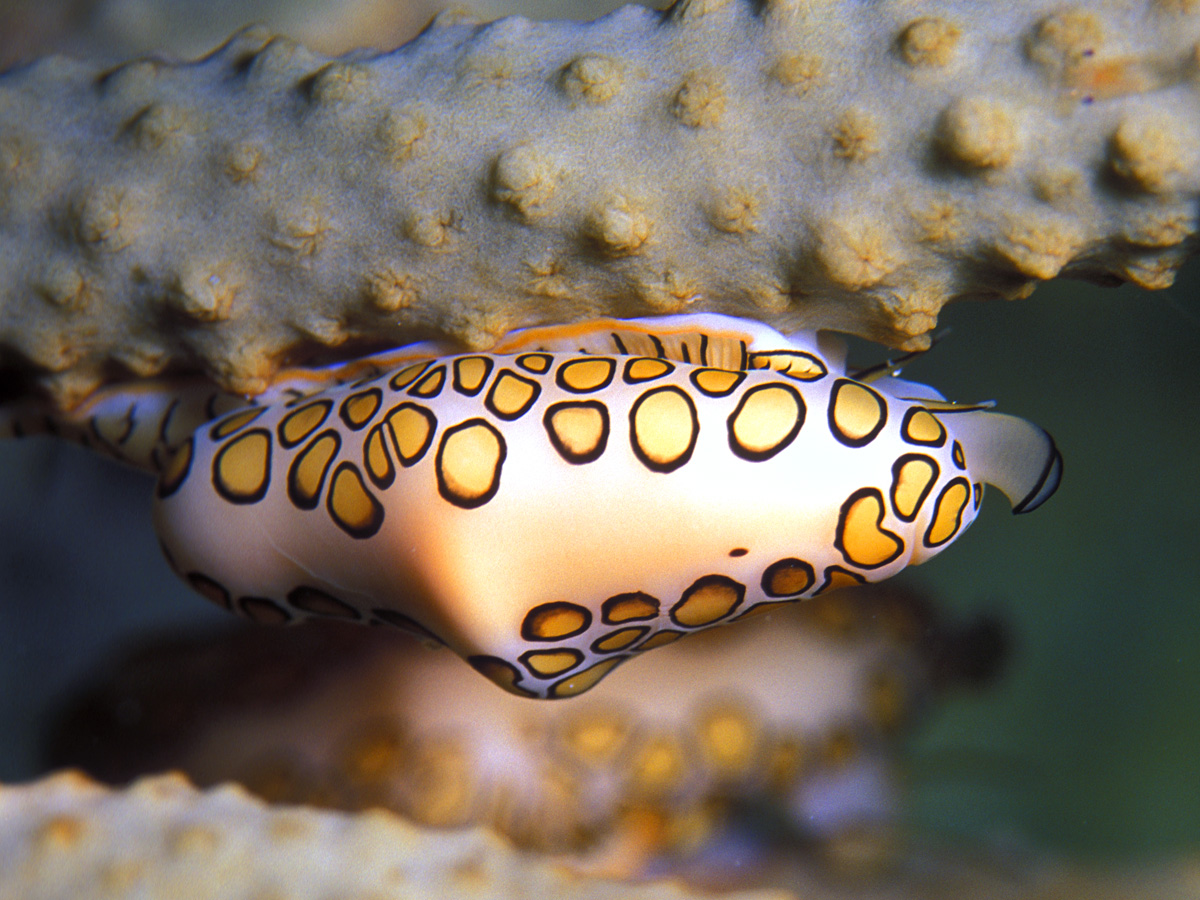
- Cyphoma gibbosum

Scientific classification
- Kingdom: Animalia
- Phylum: Mollusca
- Class: Gastropoda
- Subclass: Caenogastropoda
- Order: Littorinimorpha
- Family: Ovulidae
- Subfamily: Simniinae; F. A. Schilder, 1925

= Simniinae =

Subfamily of molluscs

Simniinae is a subfamily of molluscs in the Ovulidae family of gastropods.

== Genera ==
Depending on authority, it contains between 7 and 12 genera (see genus list at Ovulidae).

- Contrasimnia Lorenz & Fehse, 2009
- Cymbovula C. N. Cate, 1973
- Cyphoma Röding, 1798
- Dissona C. N. Cate, 1973
- Naviculavolva Lorenz & Fehse, 2009
- Neosimnia P. Fischer, 1884
- Quasisimnia Lorenz & Fehse, 2009
- Simnia Risso, 1826
- Simnialena C. N. Cate, 1973

Genera brought into synonymy

- Cymbula C. N. Cate, 1973: synonym of Cymbovula C. N. Cate, 1973 (invalid: junior homonym of Cymbula H. Adams & A. Adams, 1854; Cymbovula is a replacement name)
- Pseudocyphoma C. N. Cate, 1973: synonym of Cyphoma Röding, 1798
- Spiculata C. N. Cate, 1973: synonym of Simnia Risso, 1826
- Subsimnia C. N. Cate, 1973: synonym of Simnia Risso, 1826
- Velox Monterosato, 1878: synonym of Volva Röding, 1798 (probably a misprint of Volva)
- Xandarovula C. N. Cate, 1973: synonym of Simnia Risso, 1826
