= Pseudosimnia juanjosensii =

Scientific classification
- Kingdom: Animalia
- Phylum: Mollusca
- Class: Gastropoda
- Subclass: Caenogastropoda
- Order: Littorinimorpha
- Family: Ovulidae
- Genus: Pseudosimnia
- Species: P. juanjosensii

Binomial name
- Pseudosimnia juanjosensii (Perez & Gomez, 1987)

Synonyms
- Aperiovula juanjosensii Pérez & Gómez, 1987; Primovula bellocqae Cardin, 1997

Species of gastropod

Pseudosimnia juanjosensii is a species of sea snail, a marine gastropod mollusk in the family Ovulidae, the ovulids, cowry allies or false cowries.
