= Testudovolva freemani =

Scientific classification
- Kingdom: Animalia
- Phylum: Mollusca
- Class: Gastropoda
- Subclass: Caenogastropoda
- Order: Littorinimorpha
- Family: Ovulidae
- Genus: Testudovolva
- Species: T. freemani

Binomial name
- Testudovolva freemani (Liltved & Millard, 1994)

Synonyms
- Prionovolva freemani (Liltved & Millard, 1994)

Species of gastropod

Testudovolva freemani is a species of sea snail, a marine gastropod mollusk in the family Ovulidae, the ovulids, cowry allies or false cowries.

== Description ==
The shell size varies between 4 mm and 8 mm.

== Distribution ==
This species occurs in the Indian Ocean along Mozambique and South Africa
