= Naviculavolva deflexa =

Scientific classification
- Kingdom: Animalia
- Phylum: Mollusca
- Class: Gastropoda
- Subclass: Caenogastropoda
- Order: Littorinimorpha
- Family: Ovulidae
- Genus: Naviculavolva
- Species: N. deflexa

Binomial name
- Naviculavolva deflexa (Sowerby II, 1848)

Synonyms
- Cymbula deflexa (Sowerby II, 1848); Ovula deflexa (Sowerby II, 1848); Ovulum deflexum Sowerby II, 1848

Species of gastropod

Naviculavolva deflexa is a species of sea snail, a marine gastropod mollusk in the family Ovulidae, the ovulids, cowry allies or false cowries.
