= Globovula cavanaghi =

Scientific classification
- Kingdom: Animalia
- Phylum: Mollusca
- Class: Gastropoda
- Subclass: Caenogastropoda
- Order: Littorinimorpha
- Family: Ovulidae
- Genus: Globovula
- Species: G. cavanaghi

Binomial name
- Globovula cavanaghi (Iredale, 1931)

Synonyms
- Diminovula cavanaghi Iredale, 1931; Globovula cottesloensis Cate, 1973; Globovula spatiosa Cate, 1973; Globovula tripolia Cate, 1973; Primovula cavanaghi Allan, 1956; Prionovolva cavanaghi Schilder, 1941

Species of gastropod

Globovula cavanaghi is a species of sea snail, a marine gastropod mollusk in the family Ovulidae, the ovulids, cowry allies or false cowries.
