= Testudovolva ericae =

Scientific classification
- Kingdom: Animalia
- Phylum: Mollusca
- Class: Gastropoda
- Subclass: Caenogastropoda
- Order: Littorinimorpha
- Family: Ovulidae
- Genus: Testudovolva
- Species: T. ericae

Binomial name
- Testudovolva ericae (Cossignani & Calo, 2002)

Synonyms
- Prionovolva ericae Cossignani & Calo, 2002

Species of gastropod

Testudovolva ericae is a species of sea snail, a marine gastropod mollusk in the family Ovulidae, the ovulids, cowry allies or false cowries.

== Description ==
The shell size varies between 6 mm and 14 mm. After death, the shell appears to be a white or pale pink.

== Distribution ==
This species is distributed in the Pacific Ocean along the Philippines, Indonesia, Malaysia, New Guinea, New Caledonia, and Queensland, Australia.

== Ecology ==
Testudovolva ericae primarily feeds on sessile prey, such as Dendronephthya.
