= Dissona =

Scientific classification
- Kingdom: Animalia
- Phylum: Mollusca
- Class: Gastropoda
- Subclass: Caenogastropoda
- Order: Littorinimorpha
- Family: Ovulidae
- Subfamily: Simniinae
- Genus: Dissona; Cate, 1973

Genus of gastropods

Dissona is a genus of sea snails, marine gastropod mollusks in the family Ovulidae.

== Species ==
Species within the genus Dissona include:

- Dissona reflexa Cate, 1973
- Dissona tarasconii Bozzetti, 2007
- Dissona tosaensis (Azuma & Cate, 1971)
