= Naviculavolva massierorum =

Scientific classification
- Kingdom: Animalia
- Phylum: Mollusca
- Class: Gastropoda
- Subclass: Caenogastropoda
- Order: Littorinimorpha
- Family: Ovulidae
- Genus: Naviculavolva
- Species: N. massierorum

Binomial name
- Naviculavolva massierorum (Fehse, 1999)

Synonyms
- Cymbovula massierorum Fehse, 1999

Species of gastropod

Naviculavolva massierorum is a species of sea snail, a marine gastropod mollusk in the family Ovulidae, the ovulids, cowry allies or false cowries.

== Description ==
The shell size varies between 7 mm and 19 mm.

== Distribution ==
This species is distribute din the Indian Ocean along Tanzania, Mozambique, and South Africa.
