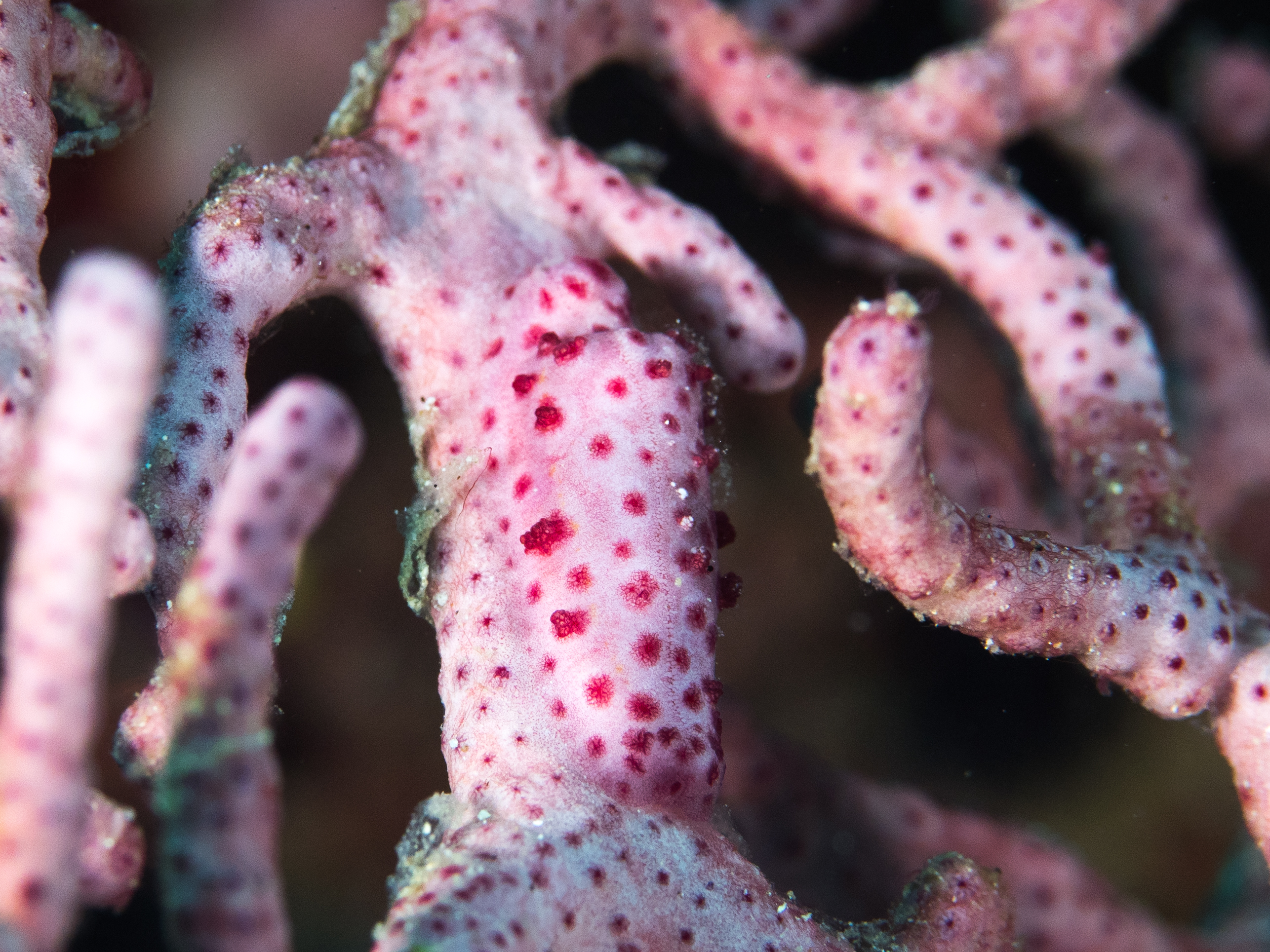
- Amonovula piriei may be difficult to spot.

Scientific classification
- Kingdom: Animalia
- Phylum: Mollusca
- Class: Gastropoda
- Subclass: Caenogastropoda
- Order: Littorinimorpha
- Family: Ovulidae
- Genus: Amonovula; Fehse, 2019
- Species: A. piriei

Binomial name
- Amonovula piriei (Petuch, 1973)

Synonyms
- Primovula piriei Petuch, 1973; Prosimnia piriei (Petuch, 1973)

= Amonovula =

Genus of gastropods

Amonovula is a monotypic genus of marine gastropod molluscs in the family Ovulidae, the ovulids, cowry allies or false cowries

== Species ==
- Amonovula piriei is the only species in the genus.

== Distribution ==
It is found in the western Pacific Ocean, living in association with a gorgonian; its colour varies so that it matches the colouring of its host gorgonian.
