= Testudovolva pulchella =

Scientific classification
- Kingdom: Animalia
- Phylum: Mollusca
- Class: Gastropoda
- Subclass: Caenogastropoda
- Order: Littorinimorpha
- Family: Ovulidae
- Genus: Testudovolva
- Species: T. pulchella

Binomial name
- Testudovolva pulchella H. Adams, 1874

Synonyms
- Amphiperas pulchellus H. Adams, 1873; Prionovolva pulchella (H. Adams, 1873)

Species of gastropod

Testudovolva pulchella is a species of sea snail, a marine gastropod mollusk in the family Ovulidae, the ovulids, cowry allies or false cowries.
