= Testudovolva nipponensis =

Scientific classification
- Kingdom: Animalia
- Phylum: Mollusca
- Class: Gastropoda
- Subclass: Caenogastropoda
- Order: Littorinimorpha
- Family: Ovulidae
- Genus: Testudovolva
- Species: T. nipponensis

Binomial name
- Testudovolva nipponensis (Pilsbry, 1913)

Synonyms
- Ovula nipponensis Pilsbry, 1931; Prionovolva brevis Allan, 1956; Pseudosimnia kandai Cate & Azuma in Cate, 1973

Species of gastropod

Testudovolva nipponensis is a species of sea snail, a marine gastropod mollusk in the family Ovulidae, the ovulids, cowry allies or false cowries.

== Description ==
The shell size varies between 5 mm and 14 mm. Color can vary, including white, fawn or pale purple with outer lip white.

== Distribution ==
This species is distributed in the Pacific Ocean along Japan and the Philippines. Can be found at low tide as well as among soft corals.
