= Habuprionovolva aenigma =

Scientific classification
- Kingdom: Animalia
- Phylum: Mollusca
- Class: Gastropoda
- Subclass: Caenogastropoda
- Order: Littorinimorpha
- Family: Ovulidae
- Genus: Habuprionovolva
- Species: H. aenigma

Binomial name
- Habuprionovolva aenigma (Azuma & Cate, 1971)

Synonyms
- Galera aenigma (Azuma & Cate, 1971); Prionovolva aenigma Azuma & Cate, 1971

Species of gastropod

Habuprionovolva aenigma is a species of sea snail, a marine gastropod mollusk in the family Ovulidae, the ovulids, cowry allies or false cowries.
