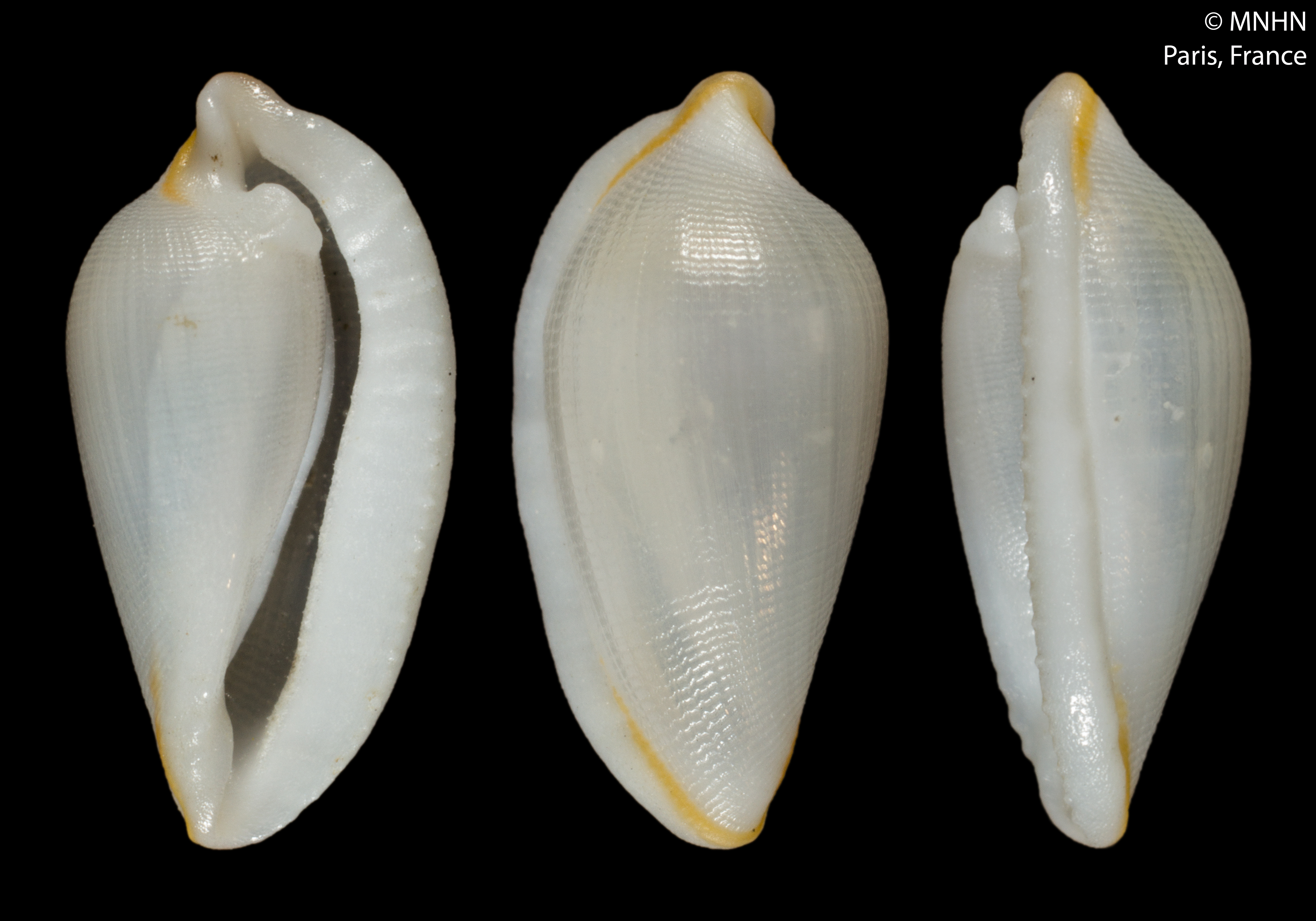
- Shell of Carpiscula virginiae (holotype at MNHN, Paris)

Scientific classification
- Kingdom: Animalia
- Phylum: Mollusca
- Class: Gastropoda
- Subclass: Caenogastropoda
- Order: Littorinimorpha
- Superfamily: Cypraeoidea
- Family: Ovulidae
- Genus: Carpiscula; Cate, 1973

= Carpiscula =

Genus of gastropods

Carpiscula is a genus of sea snails, marine gastropod mollusks in the subfamily Eocypraeinae Schilder, 1924 of the family Ovulidae.

== Species ==
Species within the genus Carpiscula include:

- Carpiscula bullata (Sowerby II in A. Adams & Reeve, 1848)
- Carpiscula galearis Cate, 1973
- Carpiscula procera Fehse, 2009
- Carpiscula virginiae Lorenz & Fehse, 2009
