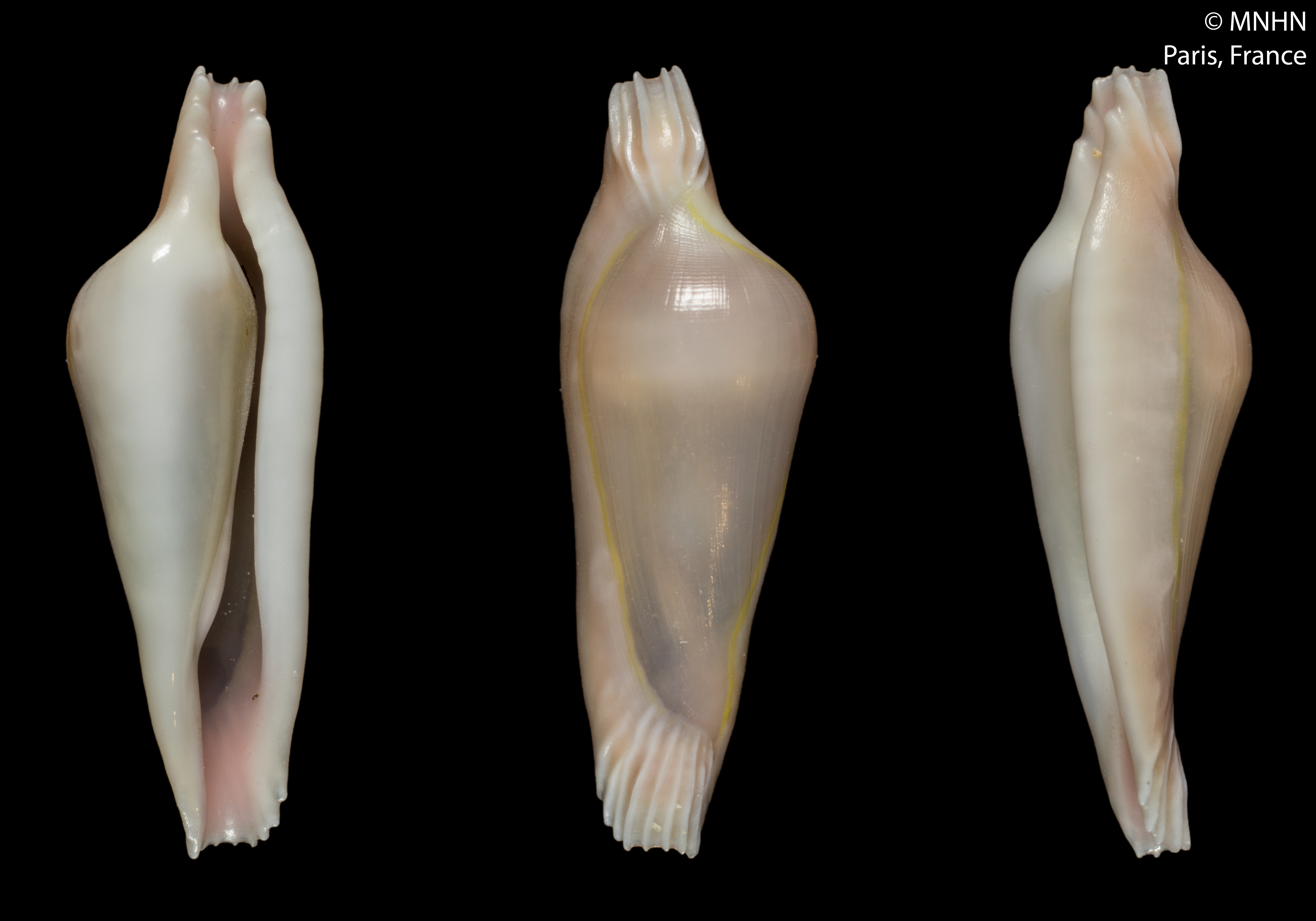
- Shell of Archivolva alexbrownii (holotype at MNHN, Paris)

Scientific classification
- Kingdom: Animalia
- Phylum: Mollusca
- Class: Gastropoda
- Subclass: Caenogastropoda
- Order: Littorinimorpha
- Family: Ovulidae
- Genus: Archivolva; Lorenz & Fehse, 2009

Type species
- Dentiovula lissenungensis Lorenz, 2005

Species
- See text

= Archivolva =

Genus of gastropods

Archivolva is a genus of sea snails, marine gastropod mollusks in the family Ovulidae.

== Species ==
Species within the genus Archivolva include:

- Archivolva alexbrownii Lorenz, 2012
- Archivolva clava (Habe, 1991)
- Archivolva kahlbrocki Lorenz, 2009
- Archivolva lissenungensis (Lorenz, 2005)
