= Rotaovula =

Scientific classification
- Kingdom: Animalia
- Phylum: Mollusca
- Class: Gastropoda
- Subclass: Caenogastropoda
- Order: Littorinimorpha
- Family: Ovulidae
- Genus: Rotaovula; Cate & Azuma in Cate, 1973

Genus of gastropods

Rotaovula is a genus of sea snails, marine gastropod mollusks in the family Ovulidae.

== Species ==
Species within the genus Rotaovula include:

- Rotaovula hirohitoi Cate & Azuma in Cate, 1973
- Rotaovula septemmacula (Azuma, 1974)
