= Globovula =

Scientific classification
- Kingdom: Animalia
- Phylum: Mollusca
- Class: Gastropoda
- Subclass: Caenogastropoda
- Order: Littorinimorpha
- Family: Ovulidae
- Genus: Globovula; Cate, 1973

Genus of gastropods

Globovula is a genus of sea snails, marine gastropod mollusks in the family Ovulidae.

== Species ==
Species within the genus Globovula include:

- Globovula cavanaghi (Iredale, 1931)
- Globovula sphaera Cate, 1973
