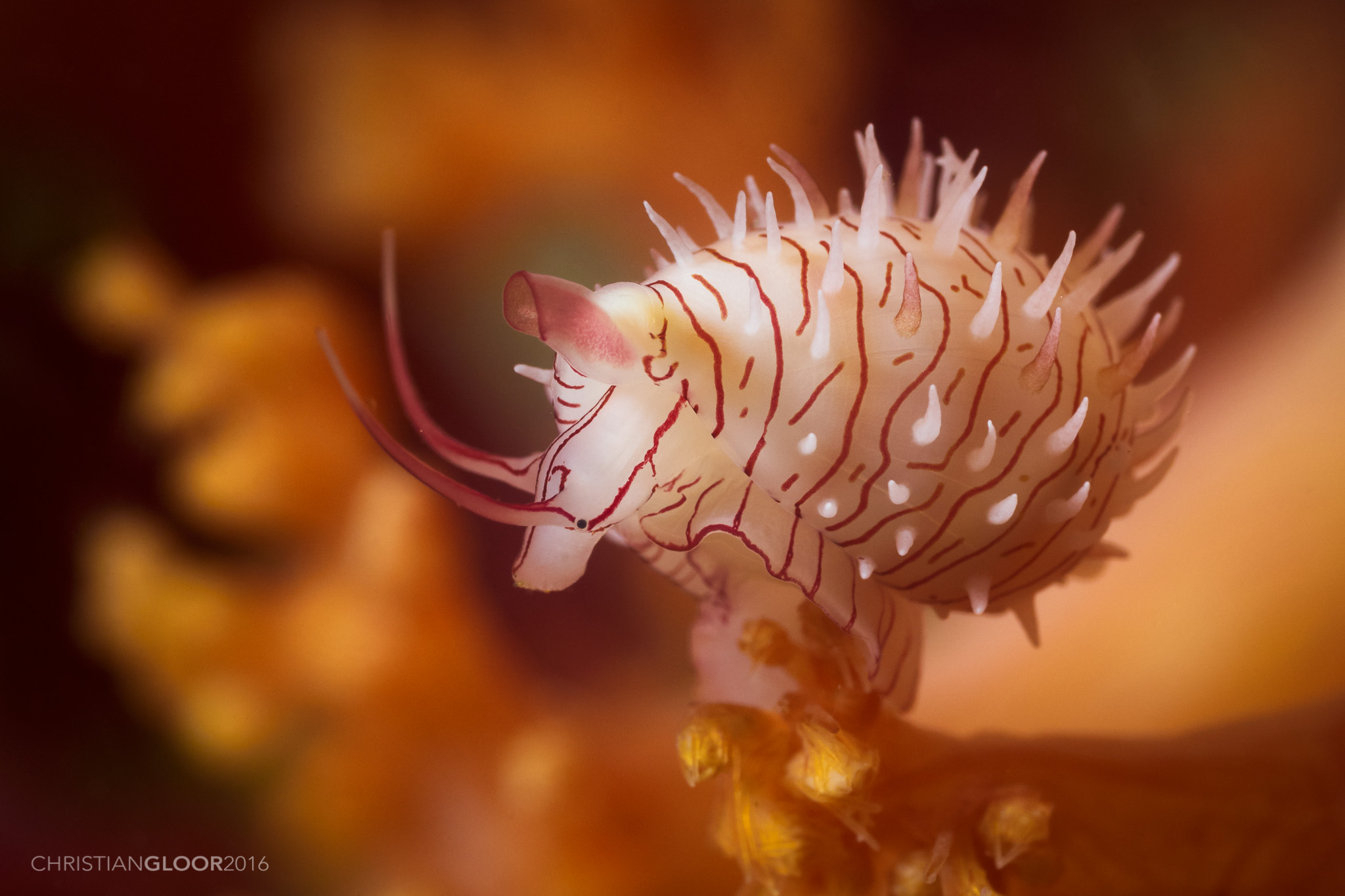
- Habuprionovolva basilia

Scientific classification
- Kingdom: Animalia
- Phylum: Mollusca
- Class: Gastropoda
- Subclass: Caenogastropoda
- Order: Littorinimorpha
- Family: Ovulidae
- Genus: Habuprionovolva; Azuma, 1970

Synonyms
- Galera Cate, 1973; Galeravolva Cate, 1973

= Habuprionovolva =

Genus of gastropods

Habuprionovolva is a genus of sea snails, marine gastropod mollusks in the family Ovulidae.

== Species ==
Species within the genus Habuprionovolva include:

- Habuprionovolva aenigma (Azuma & Cate, 1971)
- Habuprionovolva basilia (Cate, 1978)
- Habuprionovolva hervieri (Hedley, 1899)
- Habuprionovolva umbilicata (Sowerby II, 1848)
