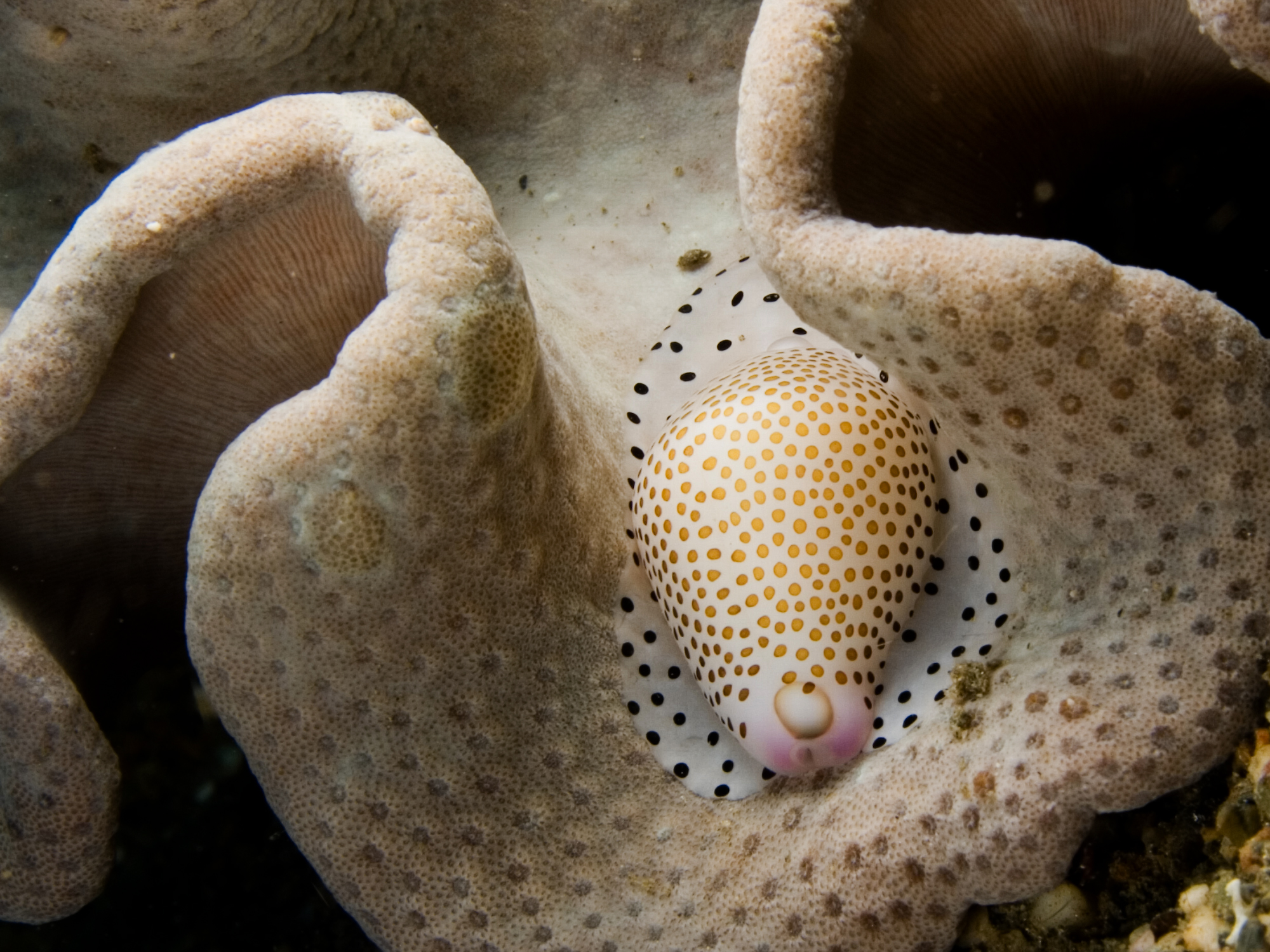
- Calpurnus verrucosus

Scientific classification
- Kingdom: Animalia
- Phylum: Mollusca
- Class: Gastropoda
- Subclass: Caenogastropoda
- Order: Littorinimorpha
- Family: Ovulidae
- Genus: Calpurnus; Montfort, 1810

Synonyms
- Cypraella Swainson, 1840

= Calpurnus =

Genus of gastropods

Calpurnus is a genus of sea snails, marine gastropod mollusks in the family Ovulidae.

== Species ==
Species within the genus Calpurnus include:

- Calpurnus verrucosus (Linnaeus, 1758)
