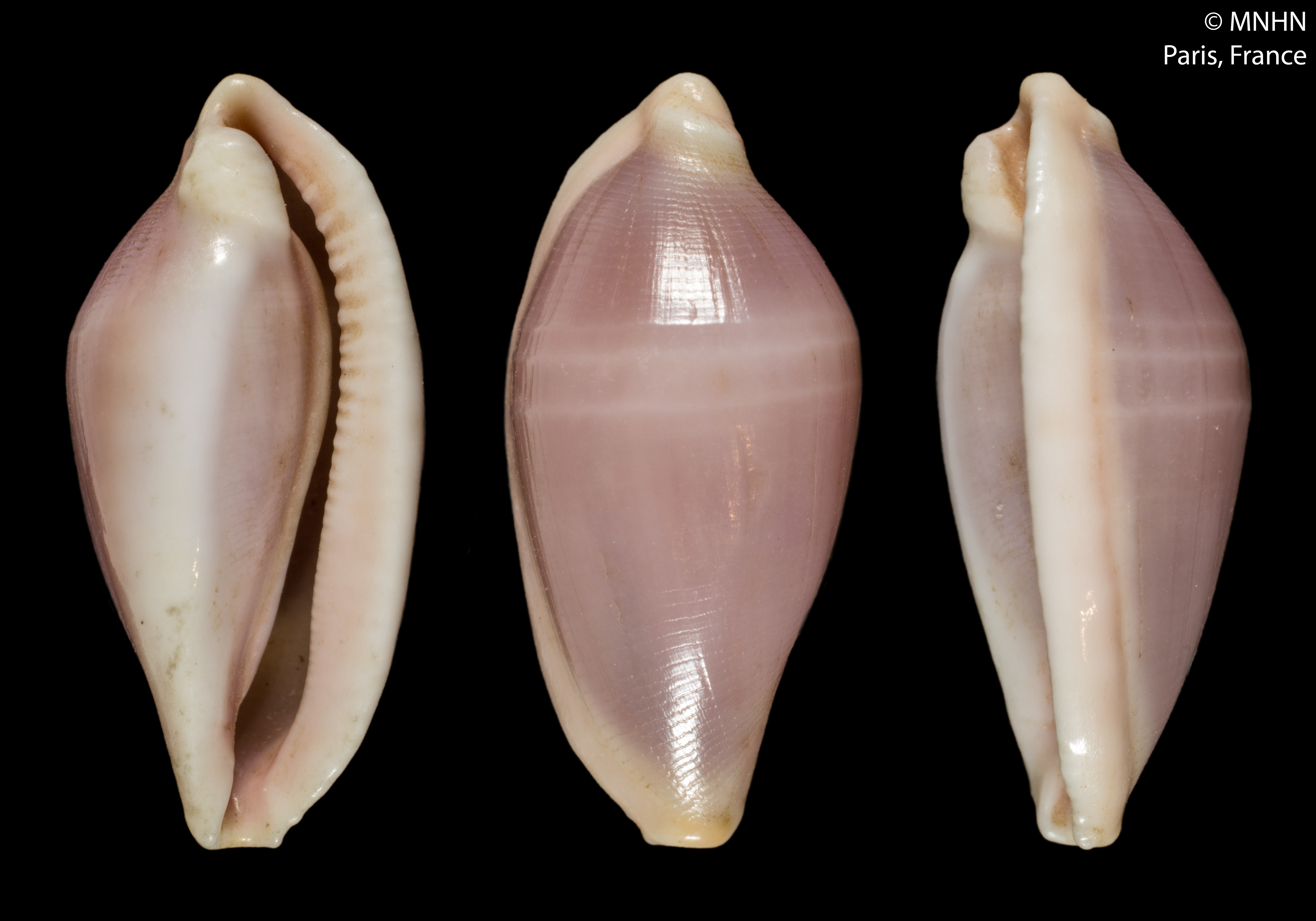
- Sandalia meyeriana

Scientific classification
- Kingdom: Animalia
- Phylum: Mollusca
- Class: Gastropoda
- Subclass: Caenogastropoda
- Order: Littorinimorpha
- Superfamily: Cypraeoidea
- Family: Ovulidae
- Genus: Sandalia; Cate, 1973

Synonyms
- Primovula (Sandalia) C. N. Cate, 1973

= Sandalia =

Genus of gastropods

Sandalia is a genus of sea snails, marine gastropod mollusks in the subfamily Eocypraeinae of the family Ovulidae.

== Species ==
Species within the genus Sandalia include:

- Sandalia meyeriana (Cate, 1973)
- Sandalia triticea (Lamarck, 1810)
- † Sandalia vibrayana (de Raincourt, 1870)

Synonyms

- Sandalia bridgesi Lorenz, 2009: synoym of Sandalia triticea (Lamarck, 1810) (junior subjective synonym)
- Sandalia pontia C. N. Cate, 1975: synonym of Sandalia triticea (Lamarck, 1810)
- Sandalia rhodia (A. Adams, 1854): synonym of Sandalia triticea (Lamarck, 1810)
