= Testudovolva =

Scientific classification
- Kingdom: Animalia
- Phylum: Mollusca
- Class: Gastropoda
- Subclass: Caenogastropoda
- Order: Littorinimorpha
- Family: Ovulidae
- Genus: Testudovolva; Cate, 1973

Genus of gastropods

Testudovolva is a genus of sea snails, marine gastropod mollusks in the family Ovulidae.

== Species ==
Species within the genus Testudovolva include:

- Testudovolva ericae (Cossignani & Calo, 2002)
- Testudovolva intricata Cate, 1973
- Testudovolva nebula (Azuma & Cate, 1971)
- Testudovolva nipponensis (Pilsbry, 1913)
- Testudovolva orientis Cate, 1973
- Testudovolva pulchella H. Adams, 1874

Synonymized species

- Testudovolva freemani (Liltved & Millard, 1994): synonym of Prionovolva freemani Liltved & Millard, 1994
- Testudovolva quaestio Cate, 1973: synonym of Testudovolva intricata Cate, 1973
- Testudovolva somaliensis Fehse, 2001 : synonym of Margovula somaliensis (Fehse, 2001)
