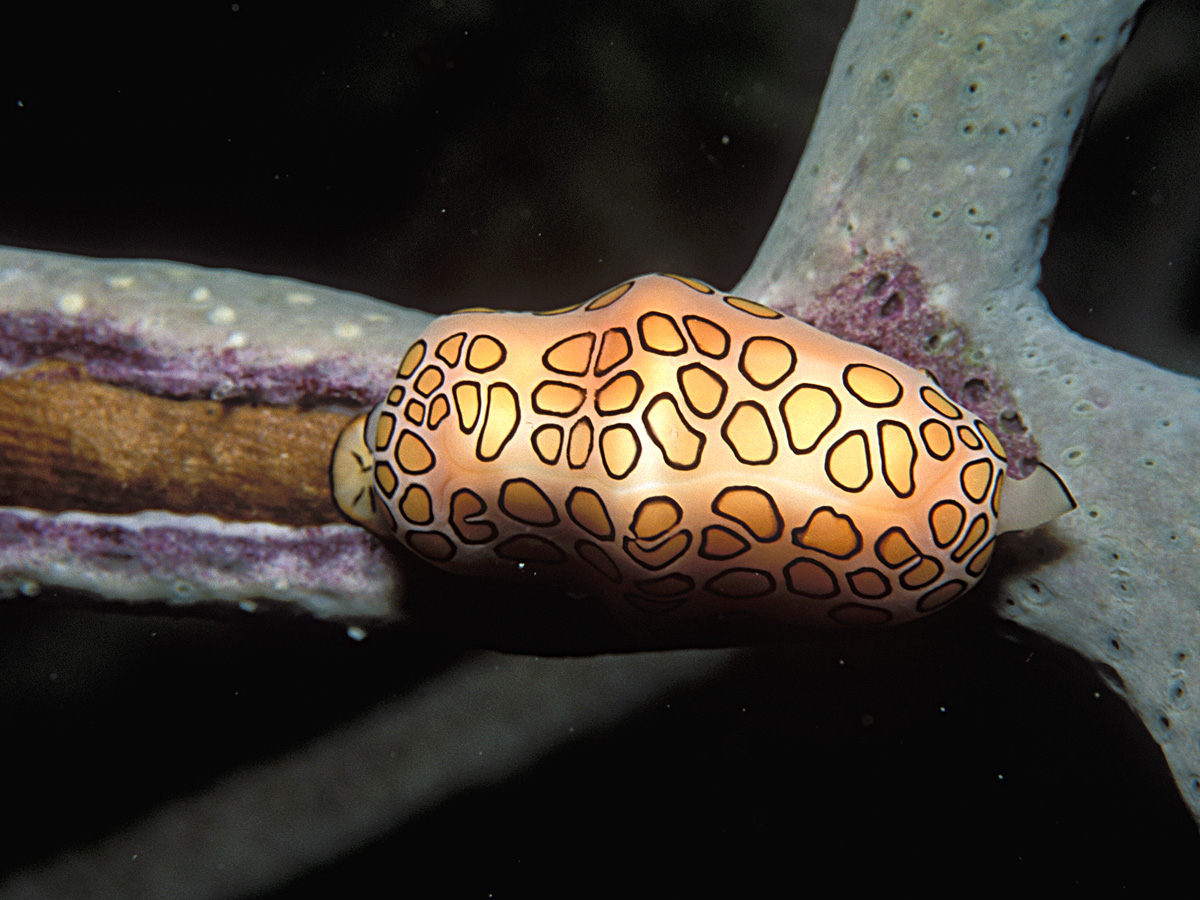
- Living Cyphoma gibbosum with mantle extended, anterior end of animal towards the top of the image. This individual is feeding on a gorgonian, with its feeding trace trailing towards the left side of the image

Scientific classification
- Kingdom: Animalia
- Phylum: Mollusca
- Class: Gastropoda
- Subclass: Caenogastropoda
- Order: Littorinimorpha
- Superfamily: Cypraeoidea
- Family: Ovulidae; Fleming, 1822

Genera
- See text

= Ovulidae =

Family of gastropods

Ovulidae, common names the ovulids, cowry allies or false cowries, is a family of small to large predatory or parasitic sea snails, marine gastropod molluscs in the superfamily Cypraeoidea, the cowries and the cowry allies.

== Distribution ==
The ovulids are a widespread family, occurring mostly in tropical and subtropical waters, with most species in the Indo-West Pacific region. But a few species live in temperate waters.

== Habitat ==
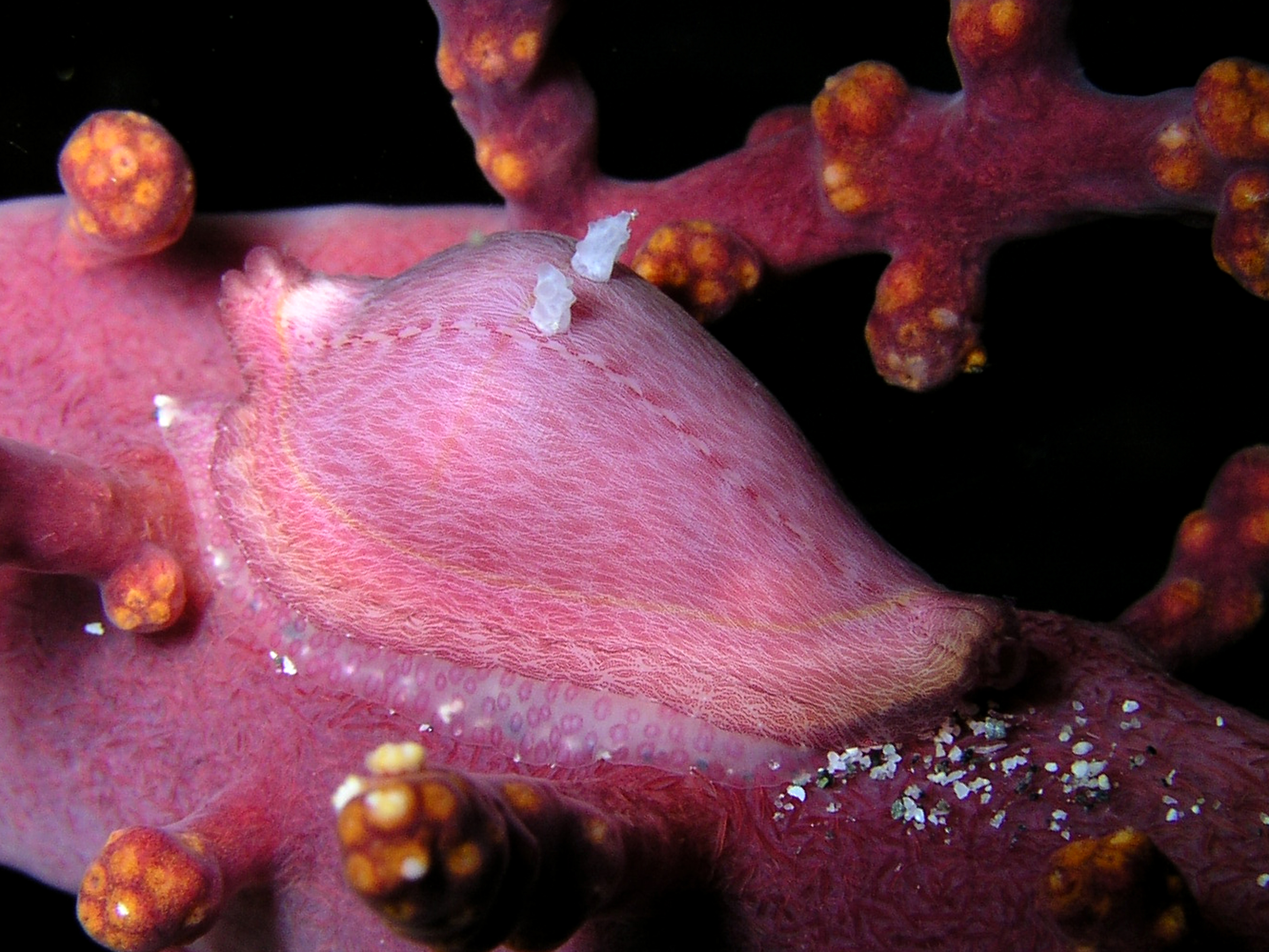
Dentiovula dorsuosa camouflaged on a soft coral.

Ovulids are carnivorous molluscs that feed on polyps and tissues of Anthozoa (as do the genera Cyphoma and Pseudocyphoma). They live on, and eat, soft corals and sea fans, and they are usually regarded as ectoparasites of these sessile colonial organisms, to which they are anchored by a long and narrow foot. This extreme specialisation in their alimentary regime has caused important morphological modifications to their radula.

== Shell description ==
Ovulids mostly have smooth shiny shells with a very long aperture and a very low or invisible spire. The shell can be pyriform (shaped like a pear), ovate (egg-shaped) to sub-ovate, cylindrical or lanceolate (lance-shaped).

The shell is often monochromatic white, but in some species the shell is pink or reddish.

In a few species of ovulids, the shell quite closely resembles that of cowries. However in many other species, the shells are so elongate that they do not so much resemble the shells of that closely related family.

When these snails are alive, the mantle completely covers the shell almost all of the time. Pictures of living animals usually show the brightly colored and decorated mantle, which looks very different from the often rather plain, shiny surface of the shell.

The color patterns of the mantle closely resemble the color patterns of the host species. This is due to the phenomenon of "alimentary homochromy" (obtaining the same color as the host by feeding on the host). This phenomenon gives them a remarkable camouflage ability.

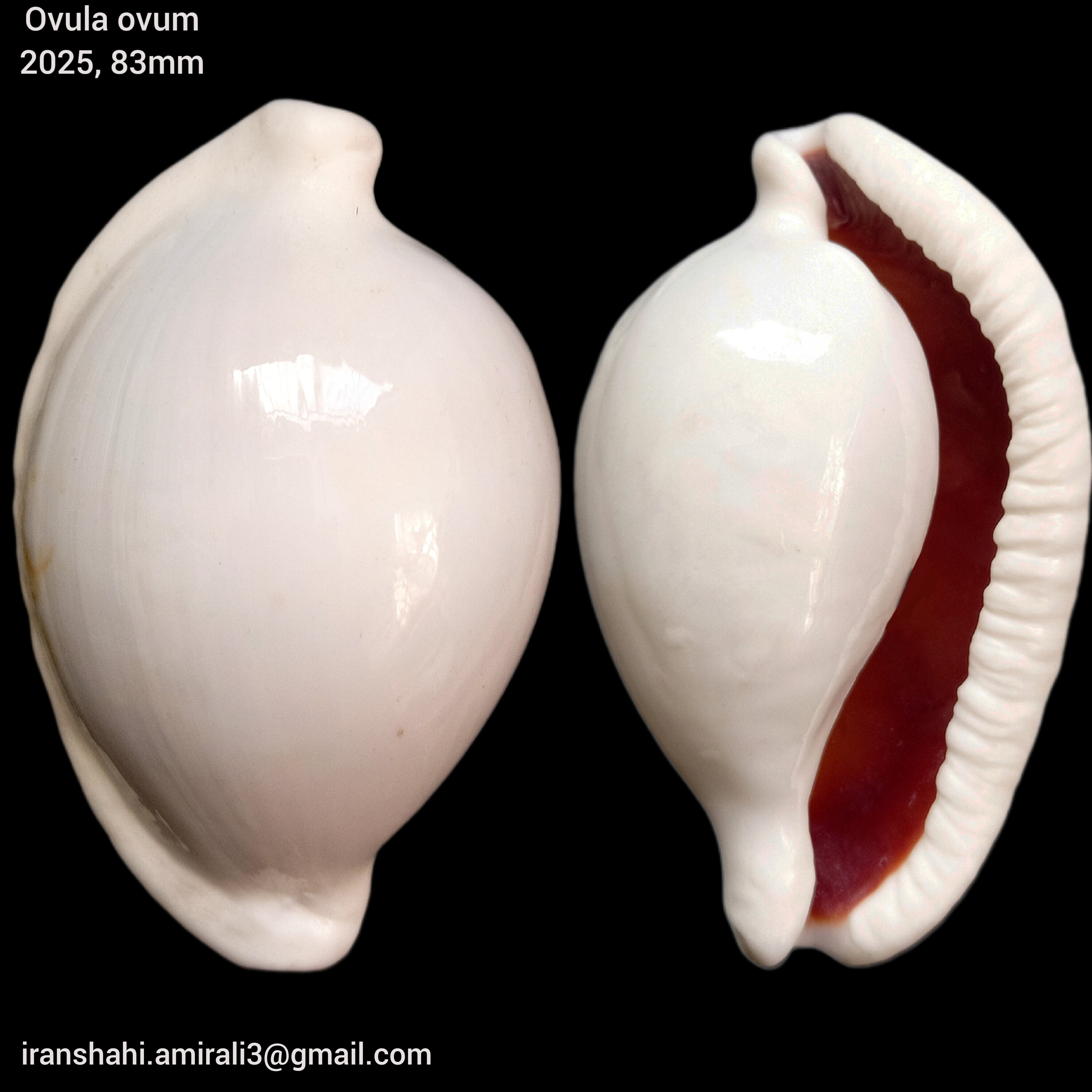
Ovula ovum

== Taxonomy ==
=== 2005 taxonomy ===
The following five subfamilies have been recognized in the taxonomy of Bouchet & Rocroi (2005):

- Ovulinae Fleming, 1822
  - tribe Ovulini Fleming, 1822 – synonyms: Amphiperatidae Gray, 1853; Simniini Schilder, 1927; Volvini Schilder, 1932
  - tribe Eocypraeini Schilder, 1924 – synonym: Sulcocypraeini Schilder, 1932
- † Cypraediinae Schilder, 1927
- Jenneriinae Thiele, 1929 – synonym: Cyproglobinini Schilder, 1932
- Pediculariinae Gray, 1853
- Pseudocypraeinae Steadman & Cotton, 1943

See also Schiaparelli et al. (2005).

=== 2007 taxonomy ===
Fehse (2007) have elevated subfamily Pediculariinae to family Pediculariidae and tribe Eocypraeini to family Eocypraeidae both to family level based on morphological research of the radulae, shell and animal morphology and the molecular phylogeny research of the 16S ribosomal RNA gene. Subsequently he has established new subfamilies Prionovolvinae and Aclyvolvinae.

family Ovulidae

- subfamily Eocypraeinae F. A. Schilder, 1924
- subfamily Prionovolvinae Fehse, 2007
- subfamily Simniinae Schilder, 1925
- subfamily Ovulinae Fleming, 1828
- subfamily Aclyvolvinae Fehse, 2007

== Genera ==
Genera within the family Ovulidae include:

Subfamily Eocypraeinae F. A. Schilder, 1924 (synonym: Prionovolvinae Fehse, 2007)

- Adamantia Cate, 1973: synonym of Diminovula Iredale, 1930
- † Allmoniella Dolin & Dockery, 2018
- Amonovula Fehse, 2019
- † Apiocypraea F. A. Schilder, 1927
- Archivolva F. Lorentz, 2009
- Calpurnus Montfort, 1810<
- Carpiscula Cate, 1973
- Crenavolva Cate, 1973
- Cuspivolva Cate, 1973
- Dentiovula Hinds, 1844
- Diminovula Iredale, 1930
- † Eocypraea Cossmann, 1903
- † Eotrivia Schilder, 1924
- † Eschatocypraea Schilder, 1966
- Globovula Cate, 1973
- † Grovesia Dolin & Ledon, 2002
- Habuprionovolva Azuma, 1970
- Lacrima Cate, 1973
- † Oxycypraea F. A. Schilder, 1927
- Primovula Thiele, 1925
- Prionovolva Iredale, 1930
- Procalpurnus Thiele, 1939
- Prosimnia Schilder, 1925
- Pseudosimnia Schilder, 1925
- Rotaovula Cate & Azuma in Cate, 1973
- Sandalia Cate, 1973
- Serratovolva Cate, 1973
- † Taviania Dolin & Pacaud, 2009
- Stohleroma Cate, 1973: synonym of Cuspivolva C. N. Cate, 1973
- Testudovolva Cate, 1973

Subfamily Simniinae Schilder, 1925

- Cymbovula Cate, 1973
- Cyphoma Röding, 1798
- Dissona Cate, 1973
- Neosimnia Fischer, 1884 – synonym: Spiculata Cate, 1973
- Pseudocyphoma Cate, 1973
- Simnia Risso, 1826
- Simnialena Cate, 1973

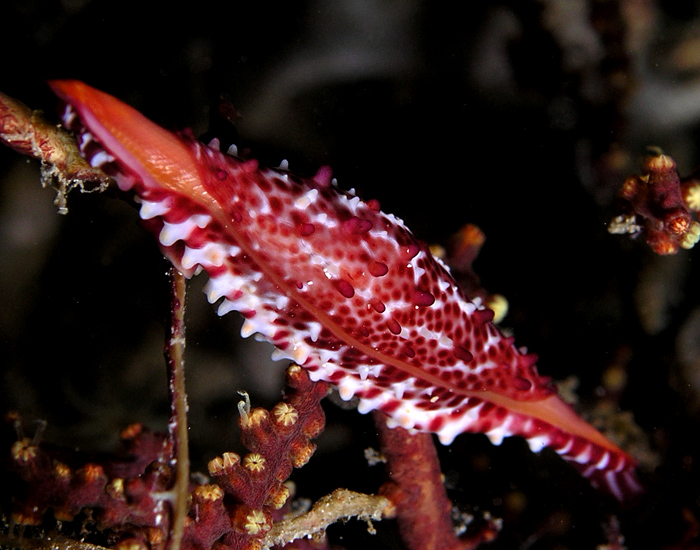
Phenacovolva rosea from East Timor.

Subfamily Ovulinae Fleming, 1828

- Calcarovula Cate, 1973
- Kurodavolva Azuma, 1987
- Ovula Bruguière, 1789
- Pellasimnia Iredale, 1931
- Phenacovolva Iredale, 1930
- Takasagovolva Azuma, 1974
- Volva Röding, 1798
- Xandarovula Cate, 1973

Subfamily Aclyvolvinae

- Aclyvolva Cate, 1973
- Hiatavolva Cate, 1973
- Kuroshiovolva Azuma & Cate, 1971

subfamily placement?

- Amonovula (Petuch, 1973)
- Aperiovula Cate, 1973
- Delonovolva Cate, 1973
- Subsimnia
