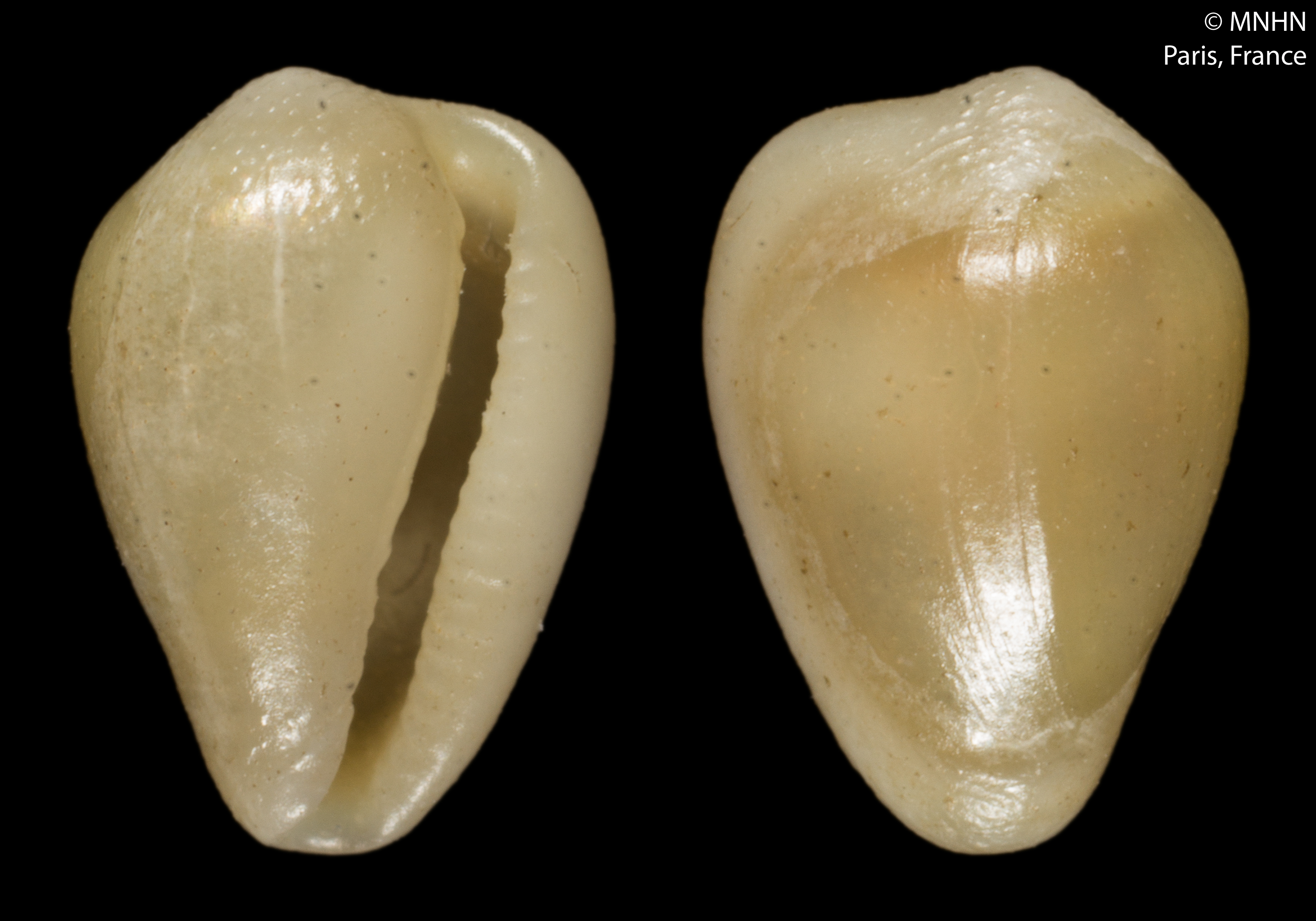
- Shell of Erato prayensis

Scientific classification
- Kingdom: Animalia
- Phylum: Mollusca
- Class: Gastropoda
- Subclass: Caenogastropoda
- Order: Littorinimorpha
- Superfamily: Cypraeoidea
- Family: Eratoidae
- Genus: Erato; Risso, 1826

Type species
- † Voluta cypraeola Brocchi, 1814

Species
- See text

Synonyms
- Erato (Erato) Risso, 1826 ·

= Erato (gastropod) =

Genus of gastropods

Erato is a genus of small sea snails, marine gastropod molluscs in the family Eratoidae, the trivias and allies.

The genus name is taken from the name of the Greek muse Erato.

== Species ==
Species within the genus Erato include:

- † Erato andecavica Schilder, 1933
- † Erato aquitanica F. A. Schilder, 1932
- † Erato britannica Schilder, 1933
- † Erato clifdenensis Laws, 1935
- † Erato cooperi Fehse & Landau, 2002
- † Erato crassa Fehse, 2020
- † Erato cypraeola (Brocchi, 1814)
- † Erato fragilis Fehse, 2020
- † Erato incrassata Coppi, 1876
- † Erato italica F. A. Schilder, 1932
- † Erato kimakowiczi O. Boettger, 1884
- † Erato laevilabiata Sacco, 1894
- † Erato lozoueti Fehse, 2018
- † Erato marshalli Marwick, 1929
- Erato oligostata Dall, 1902
- † Erato pinguis Fehse, 2020
- † Erato planulosa Sacco, 1894
- † Erato praecedens F. A. Schilder, 1933
- † Erato praecursor Cossmann & Pissarro, 1905
- Erato prayensis Rochebrune, 1882
- Erato princeps Fehse, 2020
- † Erato prodromos Fehse, 2018
- † Erato prokimakowiczi Fehse, 2020
- † Erato prolaevis Sacco, 1894
- † Erato quasiplanulosa Fehse, 2020
- † Erato senecta R. Murdoch, 1924
- † Erato subcypraeola d'Orbigny, 1852
- † Erato submorosa Laws, 1935
- † Erato tenuipustulata Fehse, 2020
- † Erato transiens Boettger, 1884
- † Erato uniplicata Depontaillier, 1881
- Erato voluta (Montagu, 1803)
- † Erato vulcania Marwick, 1926
- † Erato waitakiensis Laws, 1935

Species brought into synonymy

- * Erato albescens Dall, 1905 - whitish erato: synonym of Hespererato vitellina (Hinds, 1844) (junior subjective synonym)
- Erato africana Fehse, 2016: synonym of Erato prayensis Rochebrune, 1882
- Erato angistoma G. B. Sowerby II, 1832: synonym of Alaerato angistoma (Sowerby II, 1832)
- Erato bimaculata Tate, 1878: synonym of Cypraeerato bimaculata (Tate, 1878)
- Erato columbella Menke, 1847 - pigeon erato: synonym of Hespererato columbella (Menke, 1847)
- Erato cypraeoides C. B. Adams, 1845: synonym of Pachybathron cypraeoides (C. B. Adams, 1845)
- Erato edentula Bozzetti, 2009: synonym of Sulcerato recondita (Melvill & Standen, 1903) (probable synonym)
- Erato gallinacea (Hinds, 1844): synonym of Alaerato gallinacea (Hinds, 1844)
- Erato grata T. Cossignani & V. Cossignani, 1997: synonym of Eratoena grata (T. Cossignani & V. Cossignani, 1997)
- Erato guttula Sowerby I, 1832: synonym of Serrata guttula (Sowerby I, 1832)
- Erato haematina Sowerby II, 1859: synonym of Eratoidea hematita (Kiener, 1834)
- Erato inhanbanensis Bozzetti, 2009: synonym of Sulcerato recondita (Melvill & Standen, 1903) (probable synonym)
- Erato lachryma Sowerby I, 1832: synonym of Proterato lachryma (Sowerby I, 1832)
- Erato lactea Hutton, 1880: synonym of Austroginella muscaria (Lamarck, 1822)
- Erato laevis non Donovan, 1804, Erato maugeriae Gray, 1832 (green erato) and Erato venezuelana Weisbord, 1962 are synonyms for Hespererato maugeriae (Gray, 1832)
- Erato mactanica T. Cossignani & V. Cossignani, 1997: synonym of Alaerato mactanica (T. Cossignani & V. Cossignani, 1997)
- Erato nana Duclos in Reeve, 1865: synonym of Eratoena nana (G. B. Sowerby II, 1859)
- Erato novemprovincialis Yokoyama, 1928: synonym of Gibberula novemprovincialis (Yokoyama, 1928)
- Erato pagoboi T. Cossignani & V. Cossignani, 1997: synonym of Eratoena pagoboi (T. Cossignani & V. Cossignani, 1997)
- Erato panamensis Carpenter, 1856: synonym of Archierato panamaensis (Carpenter, 1856)
- Erato recondita Melvill & Standen, 1903: synonym of Proterato recondita (Melvill & Standen, 1903)
- Erato sandwicensis Pease, 1860: synonym of Eratoena sandwichensis (G. B. Sowerby II, 1859) (original combination)
- Erato sulcifera Gray in Sowerby I, 1832: synonym of Eratoena sulcifera (Sowerby I, 1832)
- Erato tetatua Hart, 1996: synonym of Trivellona valerieae (Hart, 1996)
- Erato vitellina (Hinds, 1844) - appleseed erato: synonym of Hespererato vitellina (Hinds, 1844)
