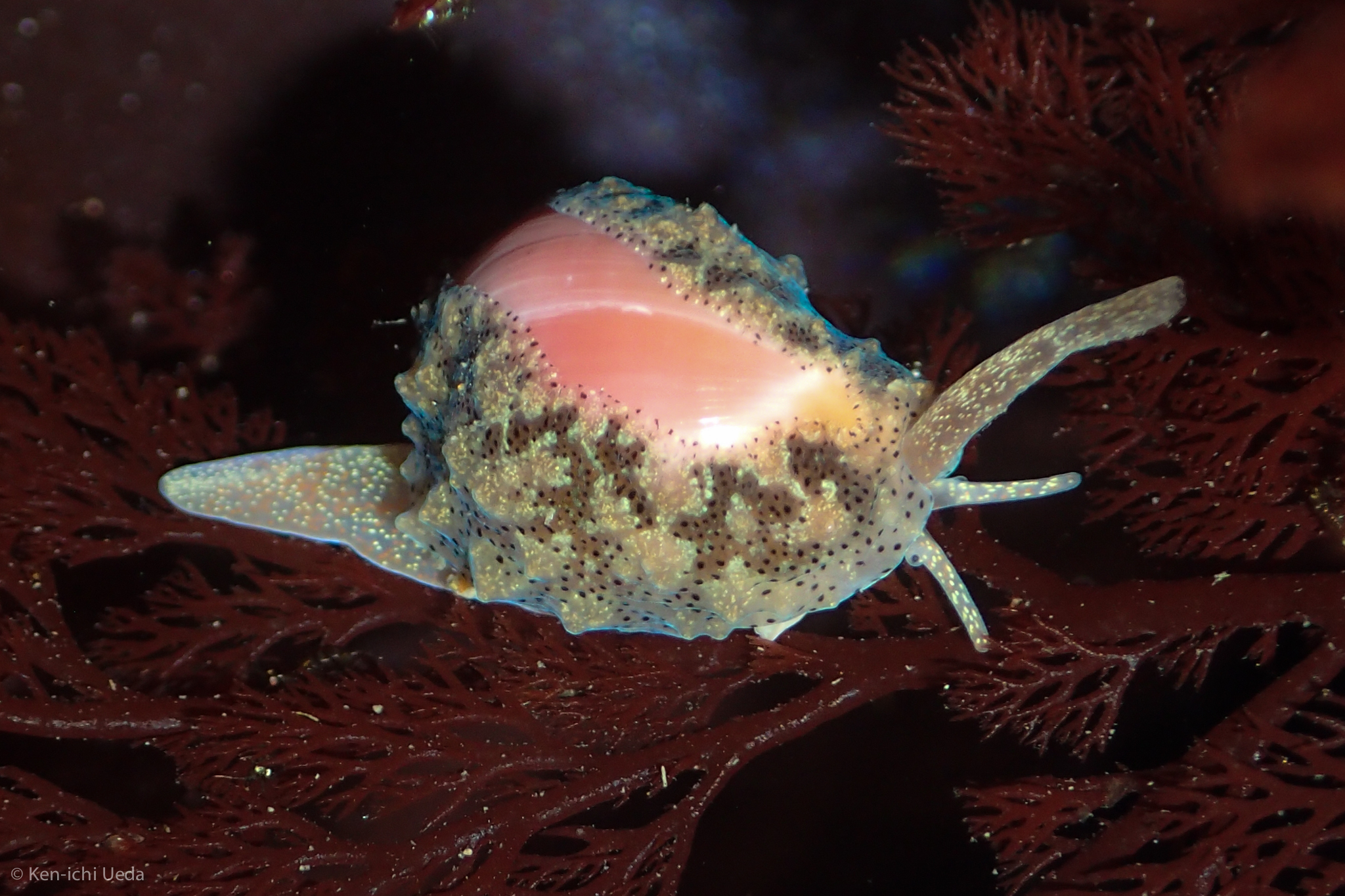
- Hespererato vitellina

Scientific classification
- Kingdom: Animalia
- Phylum: Mollusca
- Class: Gastropoda
- Subclass: Caenogastropoda
- Order: Littorinimorpha
- Superfamily: Cypraeoidea
- Family: Eratoidae
- Genus: Hespererato; Schilder, 1933

Type species
- Erato vitellina Hinds, 1844

Species
- See text

= Hespererato =

Genus of gastropods

Hespererato is a genus of small sea snails, marine gastropod mollusks in the family Eratoidae, the false cowries or trivias.

== Species ==
Species within the genus Hespererato include:

- † Hespererato ampulla (Deshayes, 1835)
- † Hespererato emmonsi (Whitfield, 1894)
- † Hespererato marqueti Fehse & Landau, 2002
- Hespererato nanhaiensis Ma, 1994
- Hespererato rubra Fehse, 2016
- Hespererato scabriuscula (Sowerby I, 1832)
- Hespererato vitellina (Hinds, 1844)

Species brought into synonymy

- Hespererato columbella (Menke, 1847): synonym of Archierato columbella (Menke, 1847)
- Hespererato galapagensis Schilder, 1933: synonym of Archierato galapagensis (Schilder, 1933)
- Hespererato marginata (Mörch, 1860): synonym of Archierato columbella (Menke, 1847)
- Hespererato martinicensis Schilder, 1933: synonym of Archierato martinicensis (Schilder, 1933)
- Hespererato maugeriae (Gray, 1832): synonym of Archierato maugeriae (Gray in G. B. Sowerby I, 1832)
- Hespererato pallida Oleinik, Petuch & Aley IV, 2012: synonym of Eratoidea watsoni (Dall, 1881)
- Hespererato rehderi (Raines, 2002): synonym of Sulcerato rehderi (Raines, 2002)
- Hespererato septentrionalis Cate, 1977: synonym of Eratoena septentrionalis (Cate, 1977)
- † Hespererato zevitellina Laws, 1941: synonym of † Bellerato zevitellina (Laws, 1941)
