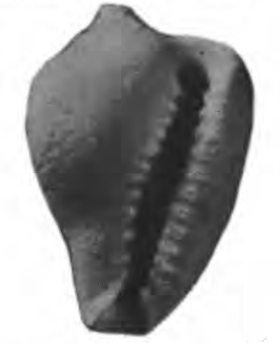
- Shell of Proterato hindlei (fossil)

Scientific classification
- Kingdom: Animalia
- Phylum: Mollusca
- Class: Gastropoda
- Subclass: Caenogastropoda
- Order: Littorinimorpha
- Superfamily: Cypraeoidea
- Family: Eratoidae
- Genus: Proterato; Schilder, 1927

Type species
- † Erato neozelanica Suter, 1917

Species
- See text

Synonyms
- Proerato Schilder, 1927 (frequent error for Proterato Schilder, 1927); Erato (Proerato) F. A. Schilder, 1927

= Proterato =

Genus of gastropods

Proterato is a genus of small sea snails, marine gastropod mollusks in the family Eratoidae, the false cowries or trivias and allies.

== Species ==
Species within the genus Proterato include:

- † Proterato awamoana Schilder, 1933
- Proterato denticulata (Pritchard & Gatliff, 1901)
- † Proterato dubia (Hutton, 1873)
- Proterato hindlei (Ladd, 1977)
- Proterato lachryma (Gray, 1832)
- † Proterato neozelanica (Suter, 1917)
- † Proterato pliocenica C. A. Fleming, 1943
- Proterato pulcherrima Fehse, 2015
- Proterato renkerorum Fehse, 2015
- † Proterato waiauensis (Laws, 1935)

Synonymized species

- Proterato bimaculata (Tate, 1878): synonym of Cypraeerato bimaculata (Tate, 1878)
- Proterato boucheti Drivas & Jay, 1986: synonym of Cypraeerato boucheti (Drivas & Jay, 1986) (original combination)
- Proterato callosa (A. Adams & Reeve, 1850): synonym of Hespererato scabriuscula (Gray, 1832)
- Proterato capensis Schilder, 1933 : synonym of Eratoena sulcifera (Gray in Sowerby I, 1832)
- Proterato gemma (Bavay, 1917): synonym of Eratoena gemma (Bavay, 1917)
- Proterato geralia C. N. Cate, 1977: synonym of Cypraeerato geralia (C. N. Cate, 1977) (original combination)
- Proterato limata X.-T. Ma, 1994: synonym of Hydroginella limata (Ma, 1994) (original combination)
- Proterato olivaria (Melvill, 1899): synonym of Eratopsis olivaria (Melvill, 1899)
- Proterato pura (Kuroda & Habe, 1971): synonym of Sulcerato pellucida (Reeve, 1865)
- Proterato recondita (Melvill & Standen, 1903): synonym of Sulcerato recondita (Melvill & Standen, 1903)
- Proterato rehderi Raines, 2002: synonym of Hespererato rehderi (Raines, 2002): synonym of Sulcerato rehderi (Raines, 2002) (original combination)
- Proterato sandwichensis (G. B. Sowerby II, 1859): synonym of Eratoena sandwichensis (G. B. Sowerby II, 1859)
- Proterato smithi F. A. Schilder, 1933: synonym of Eratoena smithi (F. A. Schilder, 1933)
- Proterato stalagmia C. N. Cate, 1975: synonym of Cypraeerato stalagmia (C. N. Cate, 1975) (original combination)
- Proterato sulcifera Gray: synonym of Eratoena sulcifera (Gray in Sowerby I, 1832)
- Proterato tomlini Schilder, 1933: synonym of Sulcerato tomlini (Schilder, 1933)
