= Hespererato nanhaiensis =

Scientific classification
- Kingdom: Animalia
- Phylum: Mollusca
- Class: Gastropoda
- Subclass: Caenogastropoda
- Order: Littorinimorpha
- Superfamily: Cypraeoidea
- Family: Eratoidae
- Genus: Hespererato
- Species: H. nanhaiensis

Binomial name
- Hespererato nanhaiensis Ma, 1994

Species of sea snail

Hespererato nanhaiensis is a species of small sea snail, a marine gastropod mollusk in the family Eratoidae, the false cowries or trivias.
