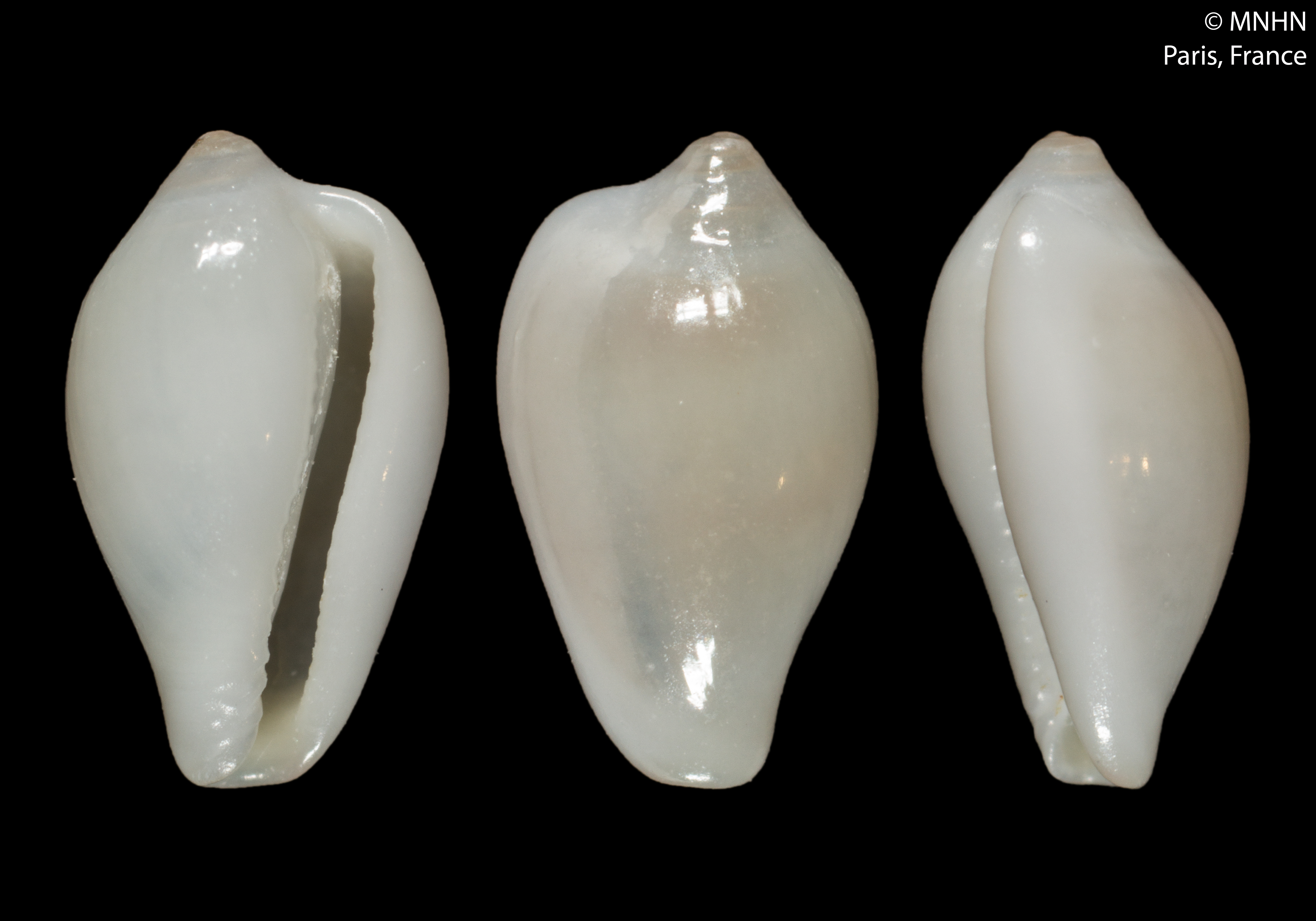
- Shell of Sulcerato recondita (holotype at MNHN, Paris)

Scientific classification
- Kingdom: Animalia
- Phylum: Mollusca
- Class: Gastropoda
- Subclass: Caenogastropoda
- Order: Littorinimorpha
- Superfamily: Cypraeoidea
- Family: Eratoidae
- Genus: Sulcerato; Finlay, 1930

Type species
- † Erato illota Tate, 1890

Species
- See text

Synonyms
- Proterato (Sulcerato) Finlay, 1930

= Sulcerato =

Genus of gastropods

Sulcerato is a genus of small sea snails, marine gastropod mollusks in the family Eratoidae, the false cowries or trivias and allies.

== Species ==
- Sulcerato haplochila (Melvill & Standen, 1903)
- † Sulcerato illota (Tate, 1890)
- Sulcerato pagoboi (T. Cossignani & V. Cossignani, 1997)
- Sulcerato pellucida (Reeve, 1865)
- Sulcerato rapa Fehse, 2020
- Sulcerato recondita (Melvill & Standen, 1903)
- Sulcerato tomlini (Schilder, 1933)

Synonyms

- Sulcerato galapagensis (F. Schilder, 1933): synonym of Archierato galapagensis (Schilder, 1933)
- Sulcerato sandwichensis (G. B. Sowerby II, 1859): synonym of Eratoena sandwichensis (G. B. Sowerby II, 1859)
- Sulcerato stalagmia (C. N. Cate, 1975): synonym of Cypraeerato stalagmia (C. N. Cate, 1975)

Taxon inquirednum

- Sulcerato rehderi (Raines, 2002)
