= Hespererato rubra =

Scientific classification
- Kingdom: Animalia
- Phylum: Mollusca
- Class: Gastropoda
- Subclass: Caenogastropoda
- Order: Littorinimorpha
- Superfamily: Cypraeoidea
- Family: Eratoidae
- Genus: Hespererato
- Species: H. rubra

Binomial name
- Hespererato rubra Fehse, 2016

Species of gastropod

Hespererato rubra is a species of small sea snail, a marine gastropod mollusk in the family Eratoidae, the false cowries or trivias and allies

== Distribution ==
This marine species occurs off Cebu Island.
