= Archierato martinicensis =

Scientific classification
- Kingdom: Animalia
- Phylum: Mollusca
- Class: Gastropoda
- Subclass: Caenogastropoda
- Order: Littorinimorpha
- Superfamily: Cypraeoidea
- Family: Eratoidae
- Genus: Archierato
- Species: A. martinicensis

Binomial name
- Archierato martinicensis Schilder, 1933

Synonyms
- Hespererato martinicensis Schilder, 1933; Hespererato maugeriae martinicensis Schilder, 1933 (basionym)

Species of gastropod

Archierato martinicensis is a species of small sea snail, a marine gastropod mollusk in the family Eratoidae, the false cowries or trivias and allies.

== Distribution ==
This marine species occurs from Florida, U.S.A. to Venezuela.
