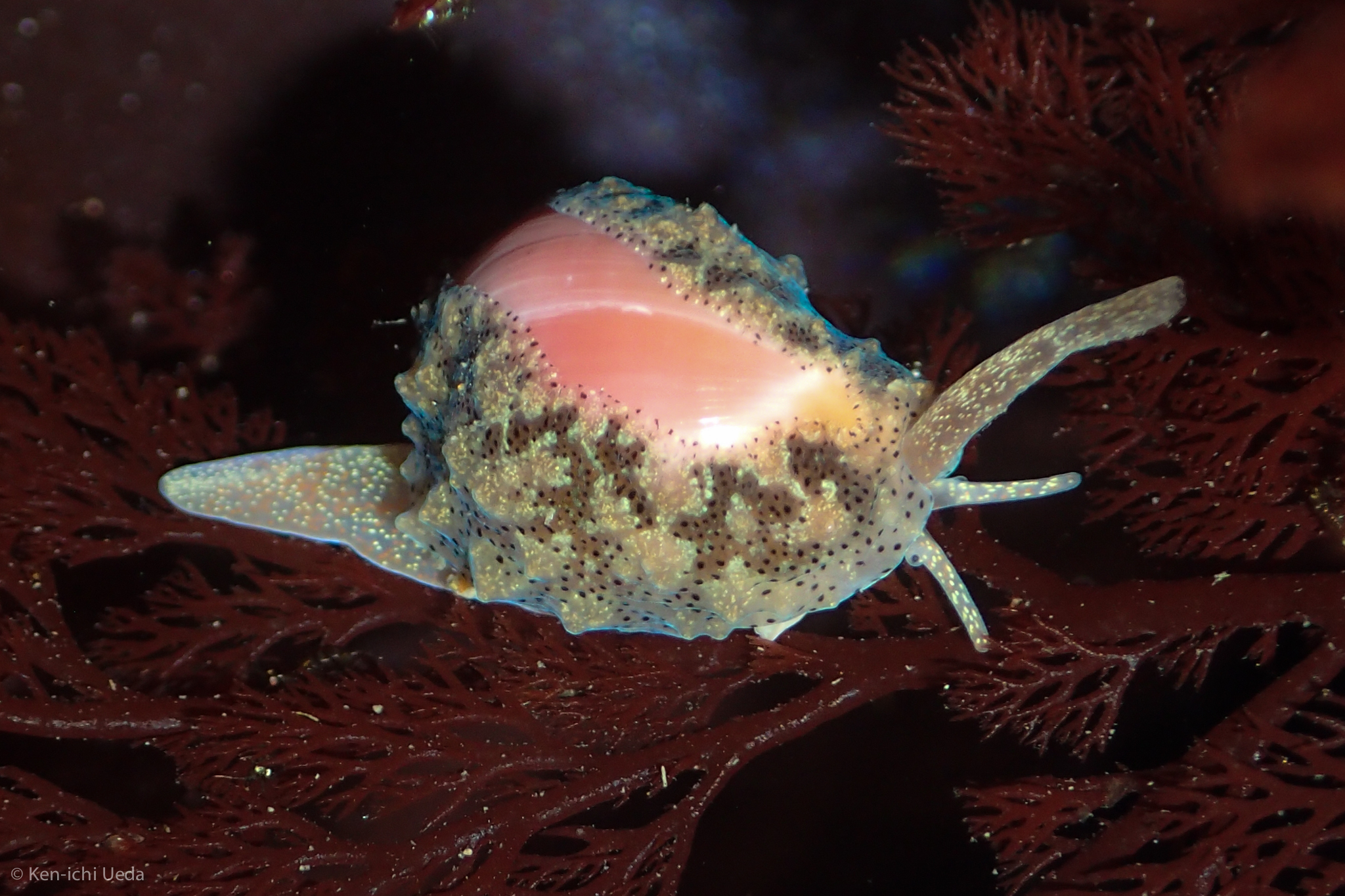

Scientific classification
- Kingdom: Animalia
- Phylum: Mollusca
- Class: Gastropoda
- Subclass: Caenogastropoda
- Order: Littorinimorpha
- Superfamily: Cypraeoidea
- Family: Eratoidae
- Genus: Hespererato
- Species: H. vitellina

Binomial name
- Hespererato vitellina (Hinds, 1844)

Synonyms
- Erato vitellina Hinds, 1844 (original combination)

= Hespererato vitellina =

Species of gastropod

Hespererato vitellina is a species of small sea snail, a marine gastropod mollusk in the family Eratoidae, the false cowries or trivias and allies.
