= Notoficula =

Scientific classification
- Kingdom: Animalia
- Phylum: Mollusca
- Class: Gastropoda
- Subclass: Caenogastropoda
- Order: Littorinimorpha
- Superfamily: Cypraeoidea
- Family: Eratoidae
- Genus: Notoficula; Thiele, 1917

Type species
- Cominella bouveti Thiele, 1912

Species
- See text

Synonyms
- Cominella (Ficulina) Thiele, 1912 (invalid: junior homonym of Ficulina Gray, 1867 [Porifera]; Notoficula is a replacement name)

Genus of gastropods

Notoficula is a genus of sea snails, marine gastropod mollusks in the family Eratoidae.

== Species ==
Species within the genus Notoficula include:

- Notoficula bouveti (Thiele, 1912)
- Notoficula otagoensis Dell, 1962
- Notoficula signeyensis Oliver, 1983

Species brought into synonymy

- Notoficula problematica Powell, 1951: synonym of Parficulina problematica(Powell, 1951)
