= Cribrarula angelae =

Scientific classification
- Kingdom: Animalia
- Phylum: Mollusca
- Class: Gastropoda
- Subclass: Caenogastropoda
- Order: Littorinimorpha
- Family: Cypraeidae
- Genus: Cribrarula
- Species: C. angelae

Binomial name
- Cribrarula angelae Moretzsohn & Beals, 2009

Species of gastropod

Cribrarula angelae is a species of sea snail, a cowry, a marine gastropod mollusc in the family Cypraeidae, the cowries.
