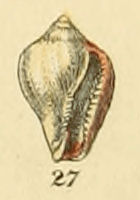

Scientific classification
- Kingdom: Animalia
- Phylum: Mollusca
- Class: Gastropoda
- Subclass: Caenogastropoda
- Order: Littorinimorpha
- Family: Eratoidae
- Genus: Erato
- Species: E. voluta

Binomial name
- Erato voluta (Montagu, 1803)

= Erato voluta =

Species of gastropod

Erato voluta is a species of small sea snail, a marine gastropod mollusk in the family Triviidae, the false cowries or trivias.
