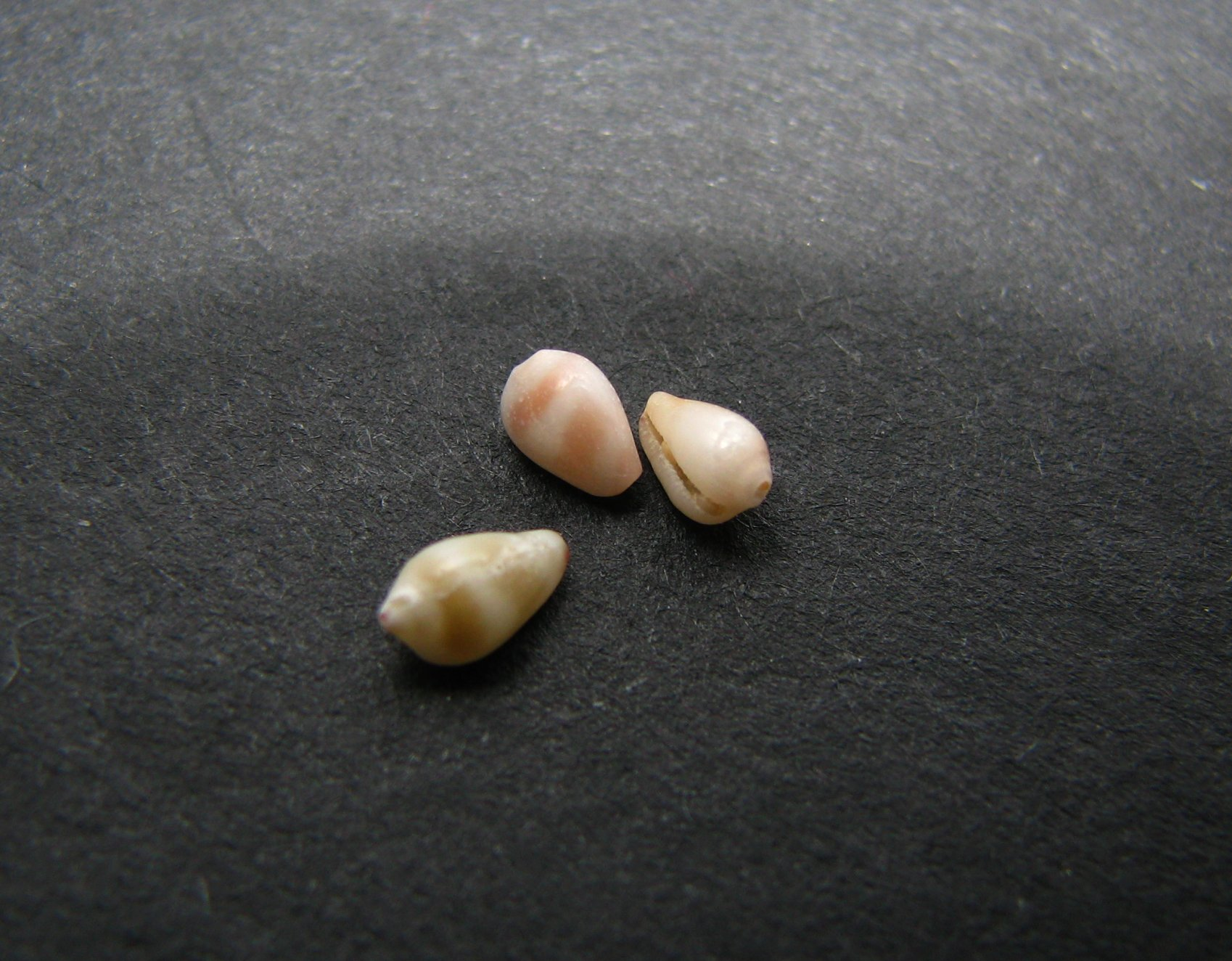
- Shell of Eratoena sandwicensis

Scientific classification
- Kingdom: Animalia
- Phylum: Mollusca
- Class: Gastropoda
- Subclass: Caenogastropoda
- Order: Littorinimorpha
- Superfamily: Cypraeoidea
- Family: Eratoidae
- Genus: Eratoena; Hinds, 1844

Type species
- Ovulum corrugatum Hinds, 1844

Synonyms
- Proterato (Eratoena) Iredale, 1935

= Eratoena =

Genus of gastropods

Eratoena is a genus of small sea snails, marine gastropod molluscs in the family Eratoidae.

== Species ==
Species within the genus Eratoena include :

- Eratoena capensis (Schilder, 1933)
- Eratoena corrugata (Hinds, 1844)
- Eratoena gourgueti Fehse, 2010
- Eratoena gemma (Bavay, 1917)
- Eratoena grata (T. Cossignani & V. Cossignani, 1997)
- Eratoena moolenbeeki Fehse, 2018
- Eratoena nana (Sowerby, 1859)
- Eratoena rosadoi Fehse, 2013
- Eratoena sandwichensis (G. B. Sowerby II, 1859)
- Eratoena schmeltziana (Crosse, 1867)
- Eratoena septentrionalis (Cate, 1977)
- Eratoena smithi (Schilder, 1933)
- Eratoena sulcifera (Gray in Sowerby I, 1832)

Species brought into synonymy

- Eratoena pagoboi (T. Cossignani & V. Cossignani, 1997): synonym of Sulcerato pagoboi (T. Cossignani & V. Cossignani, 1997)
- Eratoena palawanica Fehse, 2011: synonym of Alaerato palawanica (Fehse, 2011) (original combination)
