= Hespererato scabriuscula =

Scientific classification
- Kingdom: Animalia
- Phylum: Mollusca
- Class: Gastropoda
- Subclass: Caenogastropoda
- Order: Littorinimorpha
- Superfamily: Cypraeoidea
- Family: Eratoidae
- Genus: Hespererato
- Species: H. scabriuscula

Binomial name
- Hespererato scabriuscula Gray, 1832

Synonyms
- Erato callosa A. Adams & Reeve, 1850; Erato scabriuscula Gray, 1832 (original combination); Proterato callosa (Adams & Reeve, 1850)

Species of gastropod

Hespererato scabriuscula is a species of small sea snail, a marine gastropod mollusk in the family Eratoidae, the false cowries or trivias. and allies

== Distribution ==
This species occurs in the China Sea.
