= Caribeginella flormarina =

Scientific classification
- Kingdom: Animalia
- Phylum: Mollusca
- Class: Gastropoda
- Subclass: Caenogastropoda
- Order: Littorinimorpha
- Family: Eratoidae
- Genus: Caribeginella
- Species: C. flormarina

Binomial name
- Caribeginella flormarina Espinosa & Ortea, 1998

Species of gastropod

Caribeginella flormarina is a species of small sea snail, a marine gastropod mollusk in the family Marginellidae, the margin shells.
