= Notoficula signeyensis =

Scientific classification
- Kingdom: Animalia
- Phylum: Mollusca
- Class: Gastropoda
- Subclass: Caenogastropoda
- Order: Littorinimorpha
- Family: Eratoidae
- Genus: Notoficula
- Species: N. signeyensis

Binomial name
- Notoficula signeyensis Oliver, 1983

Species of gastropod

Notoficula signeyensis is a species of sea snail, a marine gastropod mollusc in the family Buccinidae, the true whelks.
