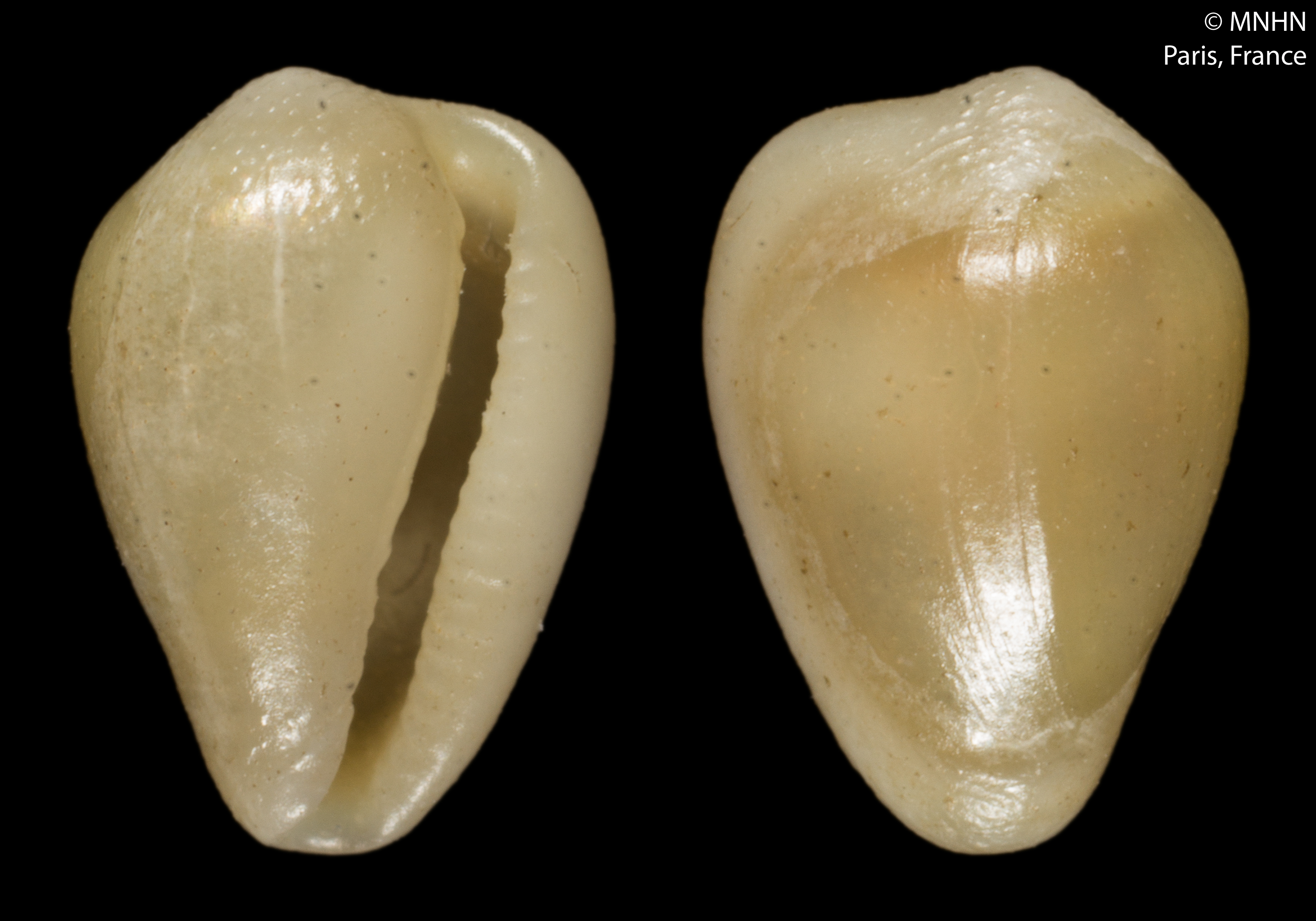
- Shell of Erato prayensis (holotype at MNHN, Paris)

Scientific classification
- Kingdom: Animalia
- Phylum: Mollusca
- Class: Gastropoda
- Subclass: Caenogastropoda
- Order: Littorinimorpha
- Family: Eratoidae
- Genus: Erato
- Species: E. prayensis

Binomial name
- Erato prayensis Rochebrune, 1881

Synonyms
- Erato africana Fehse, 2016; Gibberula prayensis (Rochebrune, 1882)

= Erato prayensis =

Species of gastropod

Erato prayensis is a species of small sea snail, a marine gastropod mollusk in the family Triviidae, the false cowries or trivias.

== Distribution ==
It is found in Cape Verde, West Africa and Angola.
