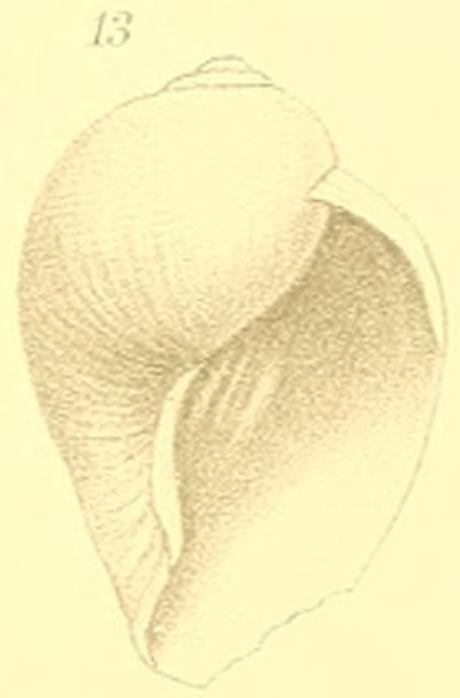

Scientific classification
- Kingdom: Animalia
- Phylum: Mollusca
- Class: Gastropoda
- Subclass: Caenogastropoda
- Order: Littorinimorpha
- Family: Eratoidae
- Genus: Notoficula
- Species: N. bouveti

Binomial name
- Notoficula bouveti (Thiele, 1912)

Synonyms
- Cominella bouveti Thiele, 1912

= Notoficula bouveti =

Species of gastropod

Notoficula bouveti is a species of sea snail, a marine gastropod mollusc in the family Buccinidae, the true whelks.
