= Archierato =

Scientific classification
- Kingdom: Animalia
- Phylum: Mollusca
- Class: Gastropoda
- Subclass: Caenogastropoda
- Order: Littorinimorpha
- Superfamily: Cypraeoidea
- Family: Eratoidae
- Genus: Archierato; Schilder, 1933

Type species
- †Erato pyrulata Tate, 1890

Species
- See text

Genus of gastropods

Archierato is a genus of small sea snails, marine gastropod mollusks in the family Eratoidae, the false cowries or trivias.

== Nomenclature ==
The name Archierato is not available from Schilder (1932), who did not provide a diagnosis.

== Species ==
- † Archierato accola (Laws, 1935)
- † Archierato antiqua (P. Marshall, 1919)
- † Archierato antonioi Fehse & Villacampa, 2018
- † Archierato aucklandica (Dell, 1950)
- † Archierato chipolana (Maury, 1910)
- Archierato columbella (Menke, 1847)
- † Archierato dalli (Morretes, 1941)
- † Archierato domingensis (Maury, 1917)
- Archierato galapagensis (Schilder, 1933)
- Archierato guadeloupensis Fehse & Simone, 2020
- Archierato janae Fehse & Simone, 2020
- Archierato martinicensis (Schilder, 1933)
- Archierato maugeriae (Gray in G. B. Sowerby I, 1832)
- Archierato michaelmonti Fehse & Simone, 2020
- Archierato panamaensis (Carpenter, 1856)
- † Archierato pyrulata (Tate, 1890)
- Archierato rhondae Fehse & Simone, 2020
- † Archierato simulacrum Laws, 1939
- † Archierato zepyrulata Laws, 1939
