= Trona (disambiguation) =

Trona is a carbonate mineral.

Trona may also refer to:

== Places ==
- Trona, Inyo County, California
- Trona, San Bernardino County, California

== Other uses ==
- Trona (gastropod), a genus of sea snails in the cowrie family
