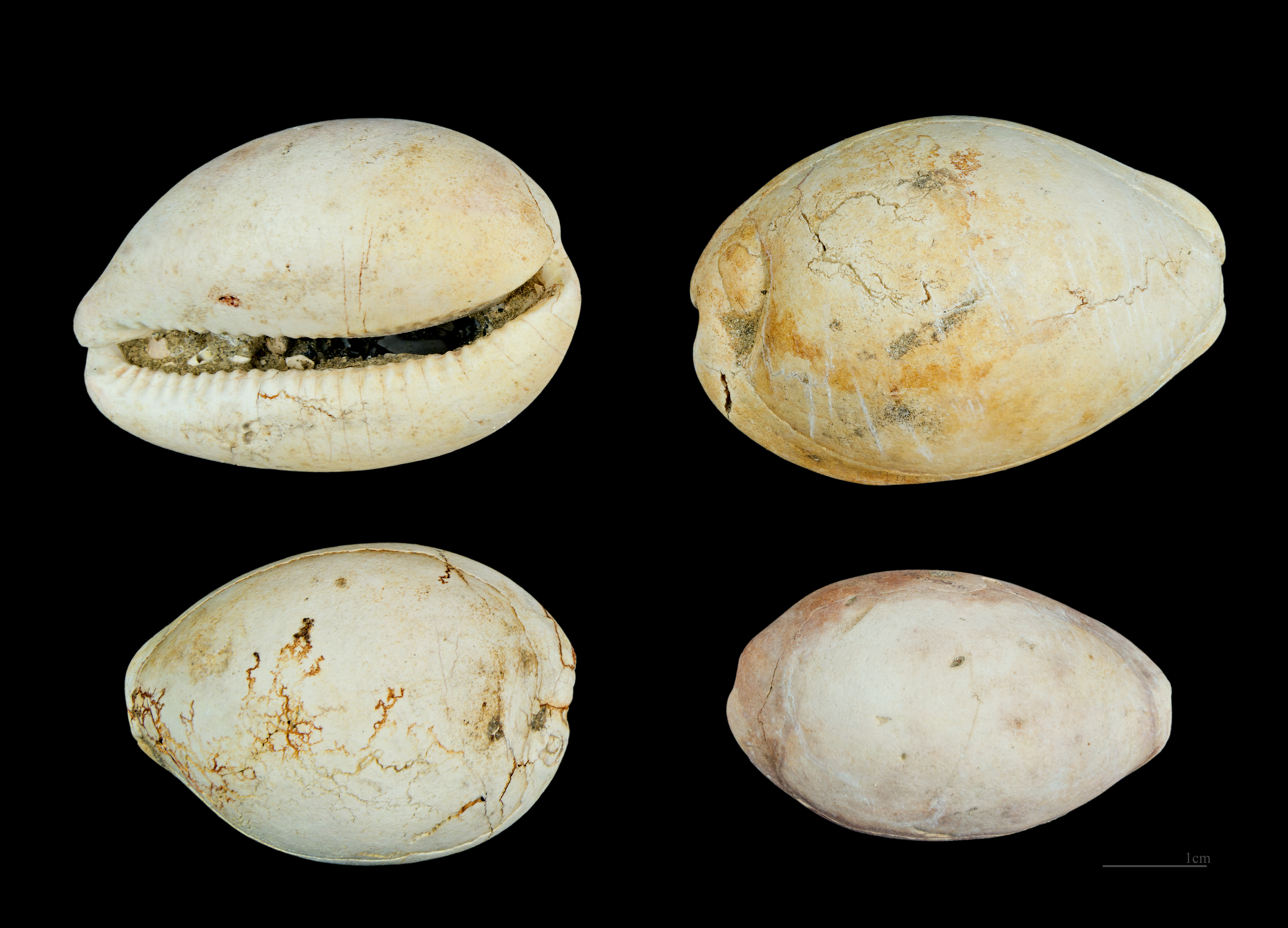
- Trona leporina

Scientific classification
- Kingdom: Animalia
- Phylum: Mollusca
- Class: Gastropoda
- Subclass: Caenogastropoda
- Order: Littorinimorpha
- Superfamily: Cypraeoidea
- Family: Cypraeidae
- Genus: Trona; Jousseaume, 1884

Type species
- Cypraea stercoraria Linnaeus, 1758

Synonyms
- † Basterotia Jousseaume, 1884 (invalid: junior homonym of...); † Cypraea (Basterotia) Bayle, 1884 †; Peribolus Blainville, 1824 (Invalid: nomen oblitum)

= Trona (gastropod) =

Genus of gastropods

Trona is a genus of sea snails, marine gastropod mollusks in the subfamily Luriinae of the family Cypraeidae, the cowries.

== Species ==
Species within the genus Trona include:

- † Trona leporina (Lamarck, 1810)
- † Trona rostrata (Grateloup, 1845)
- Trona stercoraria (Linnaeus, 1758)

== Distribution ==
This genus is found in the Atlantic Ocean off of Cape Verde, Senegal and Angola.
