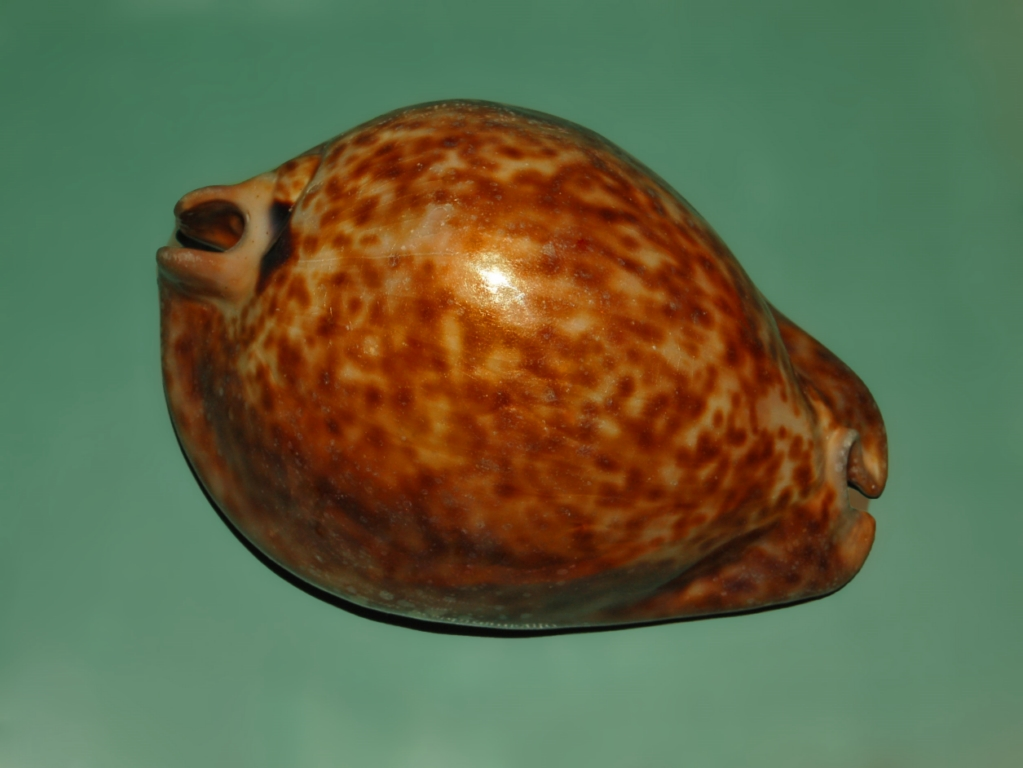
- A shell of Trona stercoraria a from Senegal, anterior end towards the right

Scientific classification
- Kingdom: Animalia
- Phylum: Mollusca
- Class: Gastropoda
- Subclass: Caenogastropoda
- Order: Littorinimorpha
- Family: Cypraeidae
- Genus: Trona
- Species: T. stercoraria

Binomial name
- Trona stercoraria (Linnaeus, 1758)

Synonyms
- Cypraea fasciata Gmelin, 1791; Cypraea rattus Lamarck, 1810 ·; Cypraea stercoraria Linnaeus, 1758 (basionym); Cypraea tumulosa Meuschen, 1778 (Invalid); Peribolus adansonii Blainville, 1824; Trona stercoraria var. rattus (Lamarck, 1810); Trona stercoraria var. tumulosa (Meuschen, 1778)

= Trona stercoraria =

Species of gastropod

Trona stercoraria, common name the rat cowry or droppings cowry, is a species of sea snail, a cowry, a marine gastropod mollusk in the family Cypraeidae, the cowries.

== Description ==
The shells of these common cowries reach on average 50–75 millimetres (2.0–3.0 in) of length, with a minimum size of 26 millimetres (1.0 in) and a maximum size of 97 millimetres (3.8 in). They are very variable in pattern and colour. The shape ranges from oval to rhomboidal. The surface is smooth and shiny, the basic color is bluish, greenish or greyish, but it can be completely dark brown or whitish. Normally there is a dense dark brown spotting on the dorsum. The wide margins are usually dark brown and the anterior and posterior canals end into well developed 'rostra'. The base may be purplish, light brown, pinkish or white, with a long and narrow aperture and long brown, beige or white fine teeth with brown spacing. The 'fossula' is considerably protruding.

== Distribution ==
Trona stercoraria occurs in west Africa along Cape Verdes, Senegal, Guinea, Cameroon, Gabon, São Tomé Island, the Congo and Angola.

== Habitat ==
These cowries usually live in shallow waters under large rocks.

== Subspecies ==
- Trona stercoraria stercoraria (Linnaeus, 1758) (synonyms : Cypraea conspurcata Gmelin, J.F., 1791; Cypraea fasciata Gmelin, J.F., 1791; Cypraea gibba Gmelin, J.F., 1791; Cypraea ligata Röding, P.F., 1798; Trona cineracea Sulliotti, G.R., 1924)
- Trona stercoraria minima (Linnaeus, C., 1758)
- Trona stercoraria var. rattus (Lamarck, 1810): accepted as Trona stercoraria (Linnaeus, 1758)
- Trona stercoraria var. tumulosa (Meuschen, 1778) accepted as Trona stercoraria (Linnaeus, 1758)
- Trona stercoraria cameroonica Lorenz 2017
