= Cribrarula gravida =

Scientific classification
- Kingdom: Animalia
- Phylum: Mollusca
- Class: Gastropoda
- Subclass: Caenogastropoda
- Order: Littorinimorpha
- Family: Cypraeidae
- Genus: Cribrarula
- Species: C. gravida

Binomial name
- Cribrarula gravida Moretzsohn, 2002

Species of gastropod

Cribrarula gravida is a species of sea snail, a cowry, a marine gastropod mollusc in the family Cypraeidae.
