= Cribrarula comma =

Scientific classification
- Kingdom: Animalia
- Phylum: Mollusca
- Class: Gastropoda
- Subclass: Caenogastropoda
- Order: Littorinimorpha
- Family: Cypraeidae
- Genus: Cribrarula
- Species: C. comma

Binomial name
- Cribrarula comma (Perry, 1811)

Subspecies
- Cribrarula comma comma (Perry, 1811); Cribrarula comma toliaraensis Bozzetti, 2007

Species of gastropod

Cribrarula comma is a species of sea snail in the family Cypraeidae, the cowries.

== Distribution ==
This species has been found in the Mozambique channel.
