= Archierato columbella =

Scientific classification
- Kingdom: Animalia
- Phylum: Mollusca
- Class: Gastropoda
- Subclass: Caenogastropoda
- Order: Littorinimorpha
- Superfamily: Cypraeoidea
- Family: Eratoidae
- Genus: Archierato
- Species: A. columbella

Binomial name
- Archierato columbella (Menke, 1847)

Synonyms
- Erato columbella Menke, 1847 (original combination); Erato leucophaea Gould, 1852; Erato marginata Mörch, 1860 (uncertain synonym; type lost); Hespererato columbella (Menke, 1847); Hespererato marginata (Mörch, 1860)

Species of gastropod

Archierato columbella is a species of small sea snail, a marine gastropod mollusk in the family Eratoidae, the false cowries or trivias and allies.

== Distribution ==
This is an Eastern Pacific species, whose range is from Monterey Bay, California, south to Panama.
