= Cribrarula astaryi =

Scientific classification
- Kingdom: Animalia
- Phylum: Mollusca
- Class: Gastropoda
- Subclass: Caenogastropoda
- Order: Littorinimorpha
- Family: Cypraeidae
- Genus: Cribrarula
- Species: C. astaryi

Binomial name
- Cribrarula astaryi F. A. Schilder, 1971

Synonyms
- Cribrarula astaryi f. lefaiti P. Martin & Poppe, 1989; Cribrarula cumingii astaryi Schilder, 1971; Cribrarula fischeri astaryi F. A. Schilder, 1971; Cribrarula lefaiti P. Martin & Poppe, 1989

Species of gastropod

Cribrarula astaryi is a species of sea snail, a cowry, a marine gastropod mollusc in the family Cypraeidae.
