= Volutifusus aguayoi =

Scientific classification
- Kingdom: Animalia
- Phylum: Mollusca
- Class: Gastropoda
- Subclass: Caenogastropoda
- Order: Neogastropoda
- Family: Volutidae
- Genus: Volutifusus
- Species: V. aguayoi

Binomial name
- Volutifusus aguayoi (Clench, 1940)

Species of gastropod

Volutifusus aguayoi is a species of sea snail, a marine gastropod mollusk in the family Volutidae, the volutes.
