= Eratoena nana =

Scientific classification
- Kingdom: Animalia
- Phylum: Mollusca
- Class: Gastropoda
- Subclass: Caenogastropoda
- Order: Littorinimorpha
- Family: Eratoidae
- Genus: Eratoena
- Species: E. nana

Binomial name
- Eratoena nana (G. B. Sowerby II, 1859)

Synonyms
- Erato nana G. B. Sowerby II, 1859

Species of gastropod

Eratoena nana is a species of small sea snail, a marine gastropod mollusk in the family Triviidae, the false cowries or trivias.
