= Volutifusus torrei =

Scientific classification
- Kingdom: Animalia
- Phylum: Mollusca
- Class: Gastropoda
- Subclass: Caenogastropoda
- Order: Neogastropoda
- Family: Volutidae
- Genus: Volutifusus
- Species: V. torrei

Binomial name
- Volutifusus torrei (Pilsbry, 1937)

Species of gastropod

Volutifusus torrei is a species of sea snail, a marine gastropod mollusk in the family Volutidae, the volutes.
