= Cribrarula garciai =

Scientific classification
- Kingdom: Animalia
- Phylum: Mollusca
- Class: Gastropoda
- Subclass: Caenogastropoda
- Order: Littorinimorpha
- Family: Cypraeidae
- Genus: Cribrarula
- Species: C. garciai

Binomial name
- Cribrarula garciai Lorenz & Raines, 2001

Species of gastropod

Cribrarula garciai is a species of sea snails, a cowry, a marine gastropod mollusc in the family Cypraeidae, the cowries.

== Description ==
Cribarula garciai has a leopard print arrangement of colored spots on the dorsal face of the shell, which grows to around 25 mm. The spots become white on the dorsum while the background becomes brown. The leopard spots begin to fade on the ventral face of the shell.

== Distribution ==
Easter Island (Rapa Nui, Chile)
