= Archierato galapagensis =

Scientific classification
- Kingdom: Animalia
- Phylum: Mollusca
- Class: Gastropoda
- Subclass: Caenogastropoda
- Order: Littorinimorpha
- Superfamily: Cypraeoidea
- Family: Eratoidae
- Genus: Archierato
- Species: A. galapagensis

Binomial name
- Archierato galapagensis (Schilder, 1933)

Synonyms
- Hespererato galapagensis F. Schilder, 1933; Hespererato marginata galapagensis F. Schilder, 1933 (basionym); Sulcerato galapagensis (F. Schilder, 1933)

Species of gastropod

Archierato galapagensis is a species of small sea snail, a marine gastropod mollusk in the family Eratoidae, the false cowries or trivias and allies.

== Distribution ==
This marine species occurs off the Galapagos Islands.
