= Cribrarula exmouthensis =

Scientific classification
- Kingdom: Animalia
- Phylum: Mollusca
- Class: Gastropoda
- Subclass: Caenogastropoda
- Order: Littorinimorpha
- Family: Cypraeidae
- Genus: Cribrarula
- Species: C. exmouthensis

Binomial name
- Cribrarula exmouthensis (Melvill, 1888)

Species of gastropod

Cribrarula exmouthensis is a species of sea snail, a cowry, a marine gastropod mollusk in the family Cypraeidae, the cowries.

== Subspecies ==
- Cribrarula exmouthensis abrolhensis Lorenz, 2002
- Cribrarula exmouthensis exmouthensis (Melvill, 1888)
- Cribrarula exmouthensis magnifica Lorenz, 2002
- Cribrarula exmouthensis rottnestensis Lorenz, 2002
