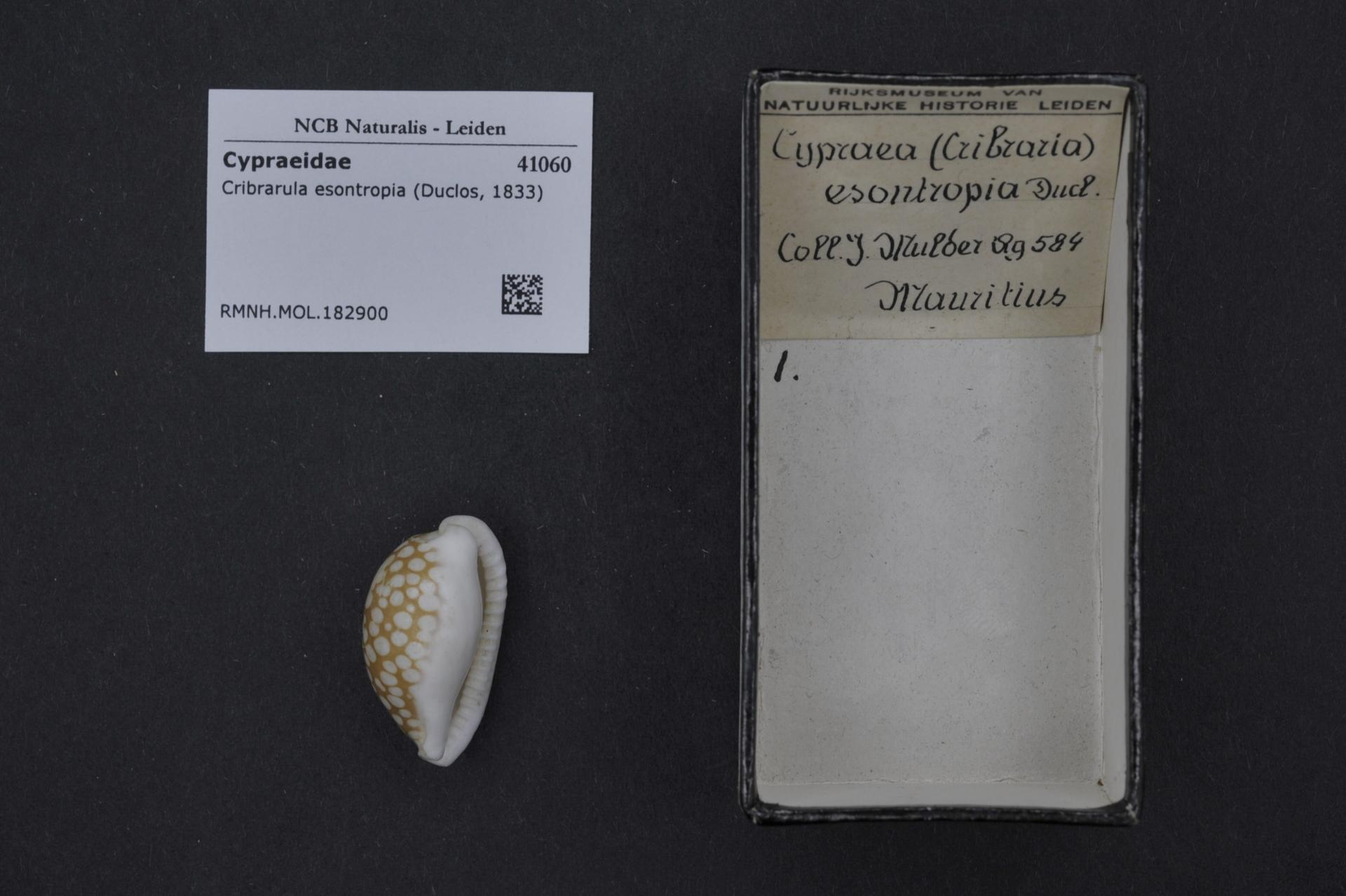

Scientific classification
- Kingdom: Animalia
- Phylum: Mollusca
- Class: Gastropoda
- Subclass: Caenogastropoda
- Order: Littorinimorpha
- Family: Cypraeidae
- Genus: Cribrarula
- Species: C. esontropia

Binomial name
- Cribrarula esontropia (Duclos, 1833)

Synonyms
- Cypraea esontropia Duclos, 1833 (basionym)

= Cribrarula esontropia =

Species of gastropod

Cribrarula esontropia is a species of sea snail, a cowry, a marine gastropod mollusk in the family Cypraeidae, the cowries.

== Subspecies ==
There are three subspecies recognized :

- Cribrarula esontropia cribellum (Gaskoin, 1849)
- Cribrarula esontropia esontropia (Duclos, 1833)
- Cribrarula esontropia francescoi (Lorenz, 2002)

== Description ==
Shell size 25 mm.

== Distribution ==
This species is found in the Indian Ocean off Mauritius and the Mascarene Basin.
