= Cribrarula abaliena =

Scientific classification
- Kingdom: Animalia
- Phylum: Mollusca
- Class: Gastropoda
- Subclass: Caenogastropoda
- Order: Littorinimorpha
- Family: Cypraeidae
- Genus: Cribrarula
- Species: C. abaliena

Binomial name
- Cribrarula abaliena Lorenz, 1989

Species of sea snail

Cribrarula abaliena is a species of sea snail, a cowry, a marine gastropod mollusc in the family Cypraeidae.

== Distribution ==
This species has been found in the Mozambique Channel and off the coast of Madagascar.
