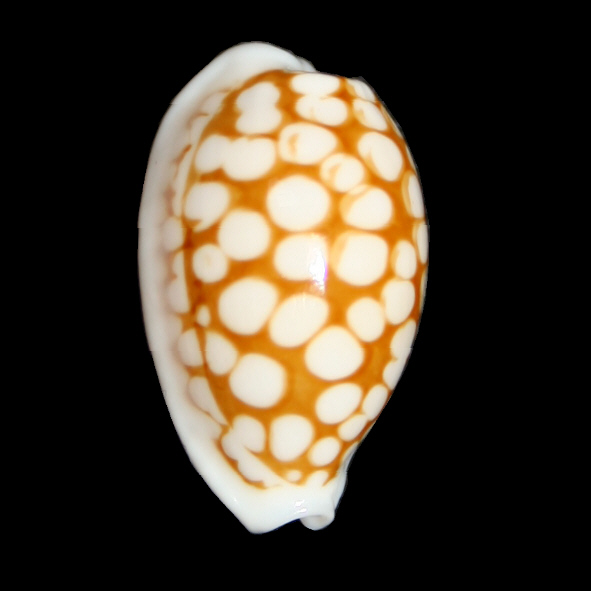
- Dorsal view of a shell of Cribrarula cribaria
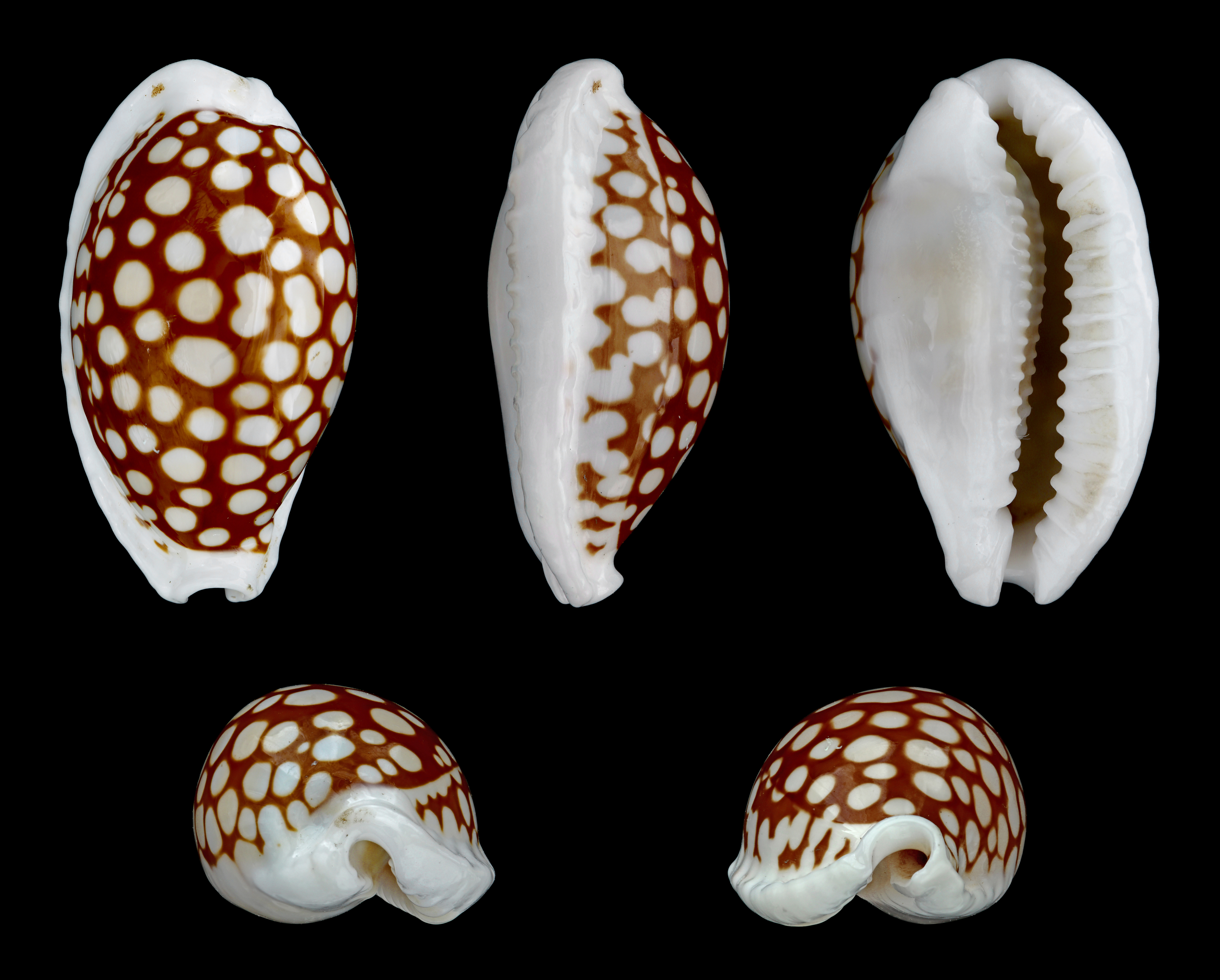
- Five views of a shell of Cribrarula cribaria

Scientific classification
- Kingdom: Animalia
- Phylum: Mollusca
- Class: Gastropoda
- Subclass: Caenogastropoda
- Order: Littorinimorpha
- Superfamily: Cypraeoidea
- Family: Cypraeidae
- Genus: Cribrarula; Strand, 1929

Type species
- Cypraea cribraria Linnaeus, 1758

Synonyms
- Adusta (Cribraria) Jousseaume, 1884; Cribraria Jousseaume, 1884 (non Persoon, 1794); Nivigena Iredale, 1930

= Cribrarula =

Genus of gastropods

Cribrarula is a genus of sea snails, marine gastropod mollusks in the family Cypraeidae, the cowries.

== Species ==
Species within the genus Cribrarula include:

- Cribrarula abaliena Lorenz, 1989
- Cribrarula abrolhensis Lorenz, 2002
- Cribrarula astaryi Schilder, 1971
- Cribrarula boninensis Simone & Takashigue, 2016
- Cribrarula catholicorum Schilder & Schilder, 1938
- †Cribrarula cincta (K. Martin, 1899)
- Cribrarula comma (Perry, 1811)
- Cribrarula compta (Pease, 1860)
- Cribrarula cribellum (Gaskoin, 1849)
- Cribrarula cribraria Linnaeus, 1758
- Cribrarula cumingii (Sowerby I, 1832)
- Cribrarula esontropia (Duclos, 1833)
- Cribrarula exmouthensis (Melvill, 1888)
- Cribrarula fallax (E.A. Smith, 1881)
- Cribrarula francescoi Lorenz, 2002
- Cribrarula garciai Lorenz & Raines, 2001
- Cribrarula gaskoini (Reeve, 1846)
- Cribrarula gaspardi Biraghi & Nicolay, 1993
- Cribrarula gravida Moretzsohn, 2002
- Cribrarula melwardi (Iredale, 1930)
- Cribrarula pellisserpentis Lorenz, 1999
- Cribrarula rottnestensis Lorenz, 2002
- Cribrarula taitae (Burgess, 1993)

Species brought into synonymy

- Cribrarula angelae Moretzsohn & Beals, 2009: accepted as Cribrarula rottnestensis angelae Moretzsohn & Beals, 2009
- Cribrarula fischeri (Vayssière, 1911): accepted as Cribrarula esontropia (Duclos, 1833)
- Cribrarula lefaiti P. Martin & Poppe, 1989: accepted as Cribrarula astaryi F. A. Schilder, 1971
- Cribrarula toliaraensis Bozzetti, 2007: accepted as Cribrarula comma toliaraensis Bozzetti, 2007
