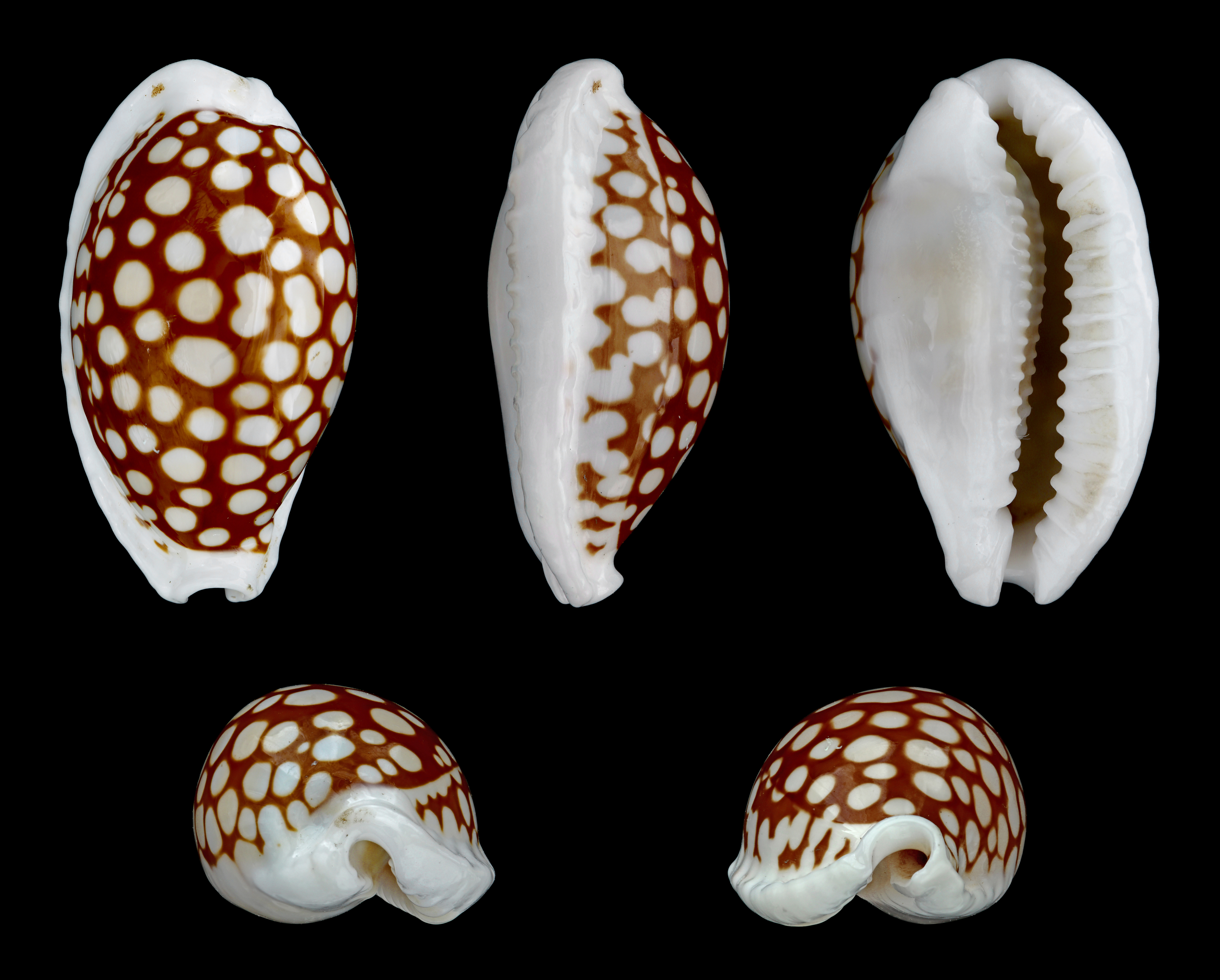
- Five views of a shell of Cribrarula cribraria

Scientific classification
- Kingdom: Animalia
- Phylum: Mollusca
- Class: Gastropoda
- Subclass: Caenogastropoda
- Order: Littorinimorpha
- Family: Cypraeidae
- Genus: Cribrarula
- Species: C. cribraria

Binomial name
- Cribrarula cribraria (Linnaeus, 1758)

Synonyms
- Cribraria cribraria (Linnaeus, 1758); Cypraea cribraria Linnaeus, 1758

= Cribrarula cribraria =

Species of gastropod

Cribrarula cribraria, the 'sieve/tan and white cowry', is a species of sea snail, a cowry, a marine gastropod mollusk in the family Cypraeidae, the cowries.

== Description ==
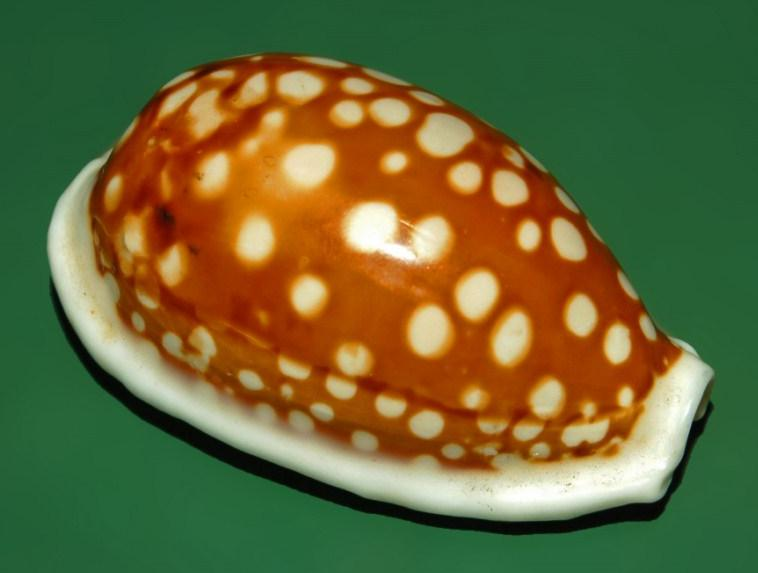
Shell of Cribrarula cribraria, dorsal view

The mantle of this cowry is translucent bright orange-red. Cribrarula cribraria is one of the most recognizable cowries. The shells reach 10–44 millimetres (0.39–1.73 in) of length. These shells are smooth, their basic coloration is pale brown or fawn, with several circular white spots. The edges of the shell are white, as is the flat base.

== Distribution ==
This species and its subspecies are distributed in the Red Sea and in the Indian Ocean along Aldabra, Chagos, the Comores, Kenya, Madagascar, Mozambique, the Seychelles and Tanzania, and in Australia, Solomon Islands, Western Samoa, Indonesia, Philippines, Taiwan, Fiji, and Vanuatu.

== Habitat ==
This species can be encountered in intertidal and shallow waters at 5–25 metres (16–82 ft) of depth, mainly underneath coral rubble and rocks. They mostly feed at night on encrusting sponges.

== Subspecies ==
The following subspecies are recognized :

- Cribrarula cribraria australiensis Lorenz, 2002
- Cribrarula cribraria comma (Perry, 1811)
- Cribrarula cribraria cribraria (Linnaeus, 1758)
