= Sulcerato rehderi =

Scientific classification
- Kingdom: Animalia
- Phylum: Mollusca
- Class: Gastropoda
- Subclass: Caenogastropoda
- Order: Littorinimorpha
- Superfamily: Cypraeoidea
- Family: Eratoidae
- Genus: Sulcerato
- Species: S. rehderi

Binomial name
- Sulcerato rehderi (Raines, 2002)

Synonyms
- Proterato (Sulcerato) rehderi Raines, 2002; Hespererato rehderi (Raines, 2002); Proterato rehderi Raines, 2002 (original combination)

Species of gastropod

Sulcerato rehderi is a species of small sea snail, a marine gastropod mollusk in the family Eratoidae, the false cowries or trivias. This is a taxon inquirendum.

== Description ==
The shell grows to a length of 1.6 mm.

== Distribution ==
This species occurs in the Pacific Ocean off Easter Island.

== Notes ==
- Raines. 2002. Contribution to the knowledge of Easter Island Mollusca. Conchiglia 34 (304): 11–40
- Raines, B.K. (2007) New molluscan records from Easter Island, with the description of a new Ethminolia. Visaya, 2(1), 70–88. page(s): 81
- Fehse D. (2020). Contributions to the knowledge of the Eratoidae. XVIII. A new Sulcerato Finlay 1930 from the Australes. Neptunea. 15(2): 7-10. page(s): 9; note: stated to be probably a synonym of S. galapagensis
