= Caribeginella =

Scientific classification
- Kingdom: Animalia
- Phylum: Mollusca
- Class: Gastropoda
- Subclass: Caenogastropoda
- Order: Littorinimorpha
- Family: Eratoidae
- Genus: Caribeginella; Espinosa & Ortea, 1998

Type species
- Caribeginella flormarina Espinosa & Ortea, 1998

Genus of gastropods

Caribeginella is a genus of small sea snails, marine gastropod mollusks in the family Eratoidae.

== Taxonomy ==
Based on its taenioglossate radula, and despite its columellar folds, Espinosa & Ortea (1998) originally allocated Caribeginella to the family Triviidae. Fehse(2012) transferred Caribeginella to the Marginellidae in the synonymy of Hyalina, and suggested that the original authors had, during radula preparation, mixed its radula with that of a species of Triviidae. This view was rejected by Caballer et al. (2013), who treated Caribeginella as a valid marginelliform genus of uncertain suprageneric classification.

== Species ==
Species within the genus Caribeginella include:

- Caribeginella flormarina Espinosa & Ortea, 1998
