= Volutifusus =

Scientific classification
- Kingdom: Animalia
- Phylum: Mollusca
- Class: Gastropoda
- Subclass: Caenogastropoda
- Order: Neogastropoda
- Family: Volutidae
- Genus: Volutifusus; Conrad, 1863

Genus of gastropods

Volutifusus is a genus of sea snails, marine gastropod mollusks in the family Volutidae.

== Species ==
Species within the genus Volutifusus include:

- Volutifusus aguayoi (Clench, 1940)
- Volutifusus piratica (Clench & Aguayo, 1940)
- Volutifusus torrei (Pilsbry, 1937)
