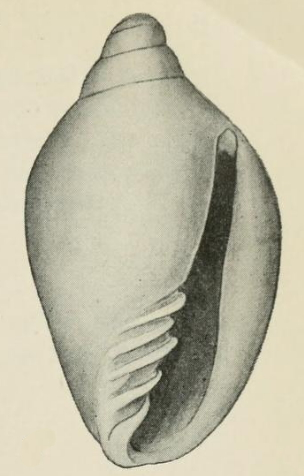
- Shell of Eratoidea subquinquidens (holotype)

Scientific classification
- Kingdom: Animalia
- Phylum: Mollusca
- Class: Gastropoda
- Subclass: Caenogastropoda
- Order: Neogastropoda
- Family: Marginellidae
- Subfamily: Marginellinae
- Genus: Eratoidea
- Species: †E. subquinquidens

Binomial name
- †Eratoidea subquinquidens (May, 1922)

Synonyms
- † Marginella subquinquidens May, 1922 † ·

= Eratoidea subquinquidens =

Extinct species of gastropod

Eratoidea subquinquidens is an extinct species of sea snail, a marine gastropod mollusk in the family Borsoniidae.

== Description ==
The length of the shell attains 5 mm, its diameter 3 mm.

(Original description) The smooth, shining shell is broadly fusiform, with a prominent blunt topped spire. It contains four, rounded whorls. They are not shouldered above the aperture. The aperture is rather narrow, widening towards the front. The columella is nearly straight, bearing five plaits, which are massive and broad, and practically all on the same slant. The fourth plait varies in different individuals, from being nearly as strong as the others, to less and less prominence, until in some specimens it is absent. Hence the name. The outer lip is rather rounded, strongly thickened and smooth within.

== Distribution ==
This extinct marine species is endemic to Tasmania and were found in Tertiary strata.
