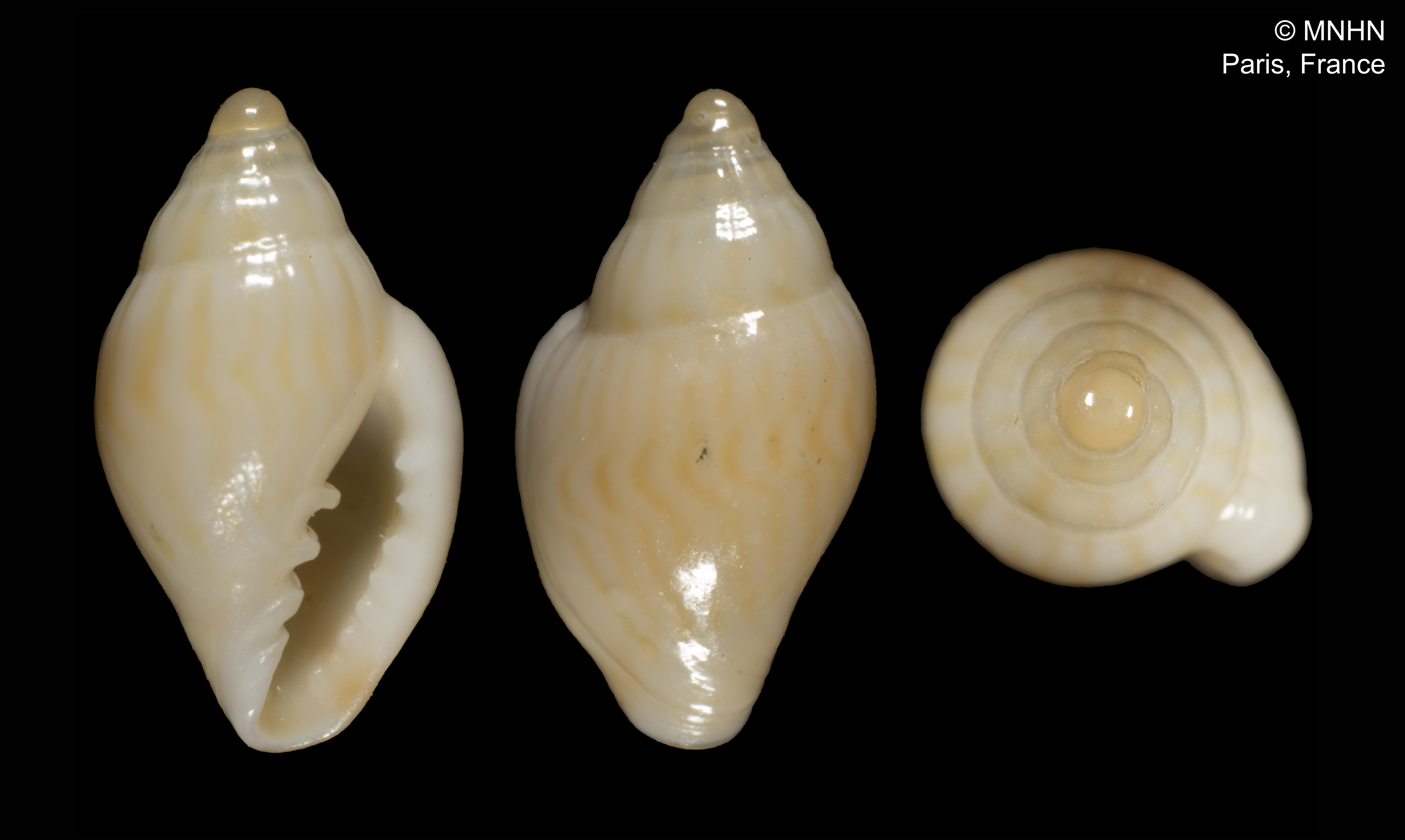
- Shell of Eratoidea aciesa (holotype at MNHN, Paris)

Scientific classification
- Kingdom: Animalia
- Phylum: Mollusca
- Class: Gastropoda
- Subclass: Caenogastropoda
- Order: Neogastropoda
- Superfamily: Volutoidea
- Family: Marginellidae
- Subfamily: Marginellinae
- Genus: Eratoidea; Weinkauff, 1879

Type species
- Marginella margarita Kiener, 1834

Synonyms
- Marginella (Eratoidea) Weinkauff, 1879 (original rank)

= Eratoidea =

Genus of gastropods

Eratoidea is a genus of sea snails, marine gastropod mollusks in the family Marginellidae, the margin snails.

== Species ==
Species within the genus Eratoidea include:

- Eratoidea aciesa McCleery, 2011
- Eratoidea acuta McCleery, 2011
- Eratoidea acutulla McCleery, 2011
- Eratoidea ampla McCleery, 2011
- Eratoidea boyeri (Bozzetti, 1994)
- Eratoidea brevisa McCleery, 2011
- Eratoidea cochensis McCleery, 2011
- Eratoidea copiosa McCleery, 2011
- Eratoidea costata (Bozzetti, 1997)
- Eratoidea costulata (Thiele, 1925)
- Eratoidea diatreta McCleery, 2011
- Eratoidea espinosai Espinosa & Ortea, 2014
- Eratoidea estensis McCleery, 2011
- Eratoidea fernandinae (Dall, 1927)
- Eratoidea fuikensis McCleery, 2011
- Eratoidea gigacostata Bozzetti, 2016
- Eratoidea glarea McCleery, 2011
- Eratoidea gorda McCleery, 2011
- Eratoidea grandis McCleery, 2011
- Eratoidea hematita (Kiener, 1834)
- Eratoidea houardi Espinosa & Ortea, 2013
- Eratoidea infera McCleery, 2011
- Eratoidea janeiroensis (E. A. Smith, 1915)
- Eratoidea kieseri Espinosa & Ortea, 2013
- Eratoidea lasallei (Talavera & Princz, 1985)
- Eratoidea lebouti Espinosa & Ortea, 2013
- Eratoidea lefebrei Espinosa & Ortea, 2013
- Eratoidea levisa McCleery, 2011
- Eratoidea lozii McCleery, 2011
- Eratoidea margarita (Kiener, 1834)
- Eratoidea megeae Espinosa & Ortea, 2013
- Eratoidea oettlyi Espinosa & Ortea, 2013
- Eratoidea perspicua McCleery, 2011
- Eratoidea phillipsi McCleery, 2011
- Eratoidea pointieri Espinosa & Ortea, 2013
- Eratoidea ponsia McCleery, 2011
- Eratoidea pustulata McCleery, 2011
- Eratoidea ranguanaensis McCleery, 2011
- Eratoidea recta McCleery, 2011
- Eratoidea robusta McCleery, 2011
- Eratoidea rosarioensis McCleery, 2011
- Eratoidea rugata McCleery, 2011
- Eratoidea rugosa McCleery, 2011
- Eratoidea scalaris (Jousseaume, 1875)
- Eratoidea sinuosa (Bozzetti, 1997)
- Eratoidea sotaventensis McCleery, 2011
- Eratoidea statiola McCleery, 2011
- † Eratoidea subquinquidens (May, 1922)
- Eratoidea sulcata (d'Orbigny, 1842)
- Eratoidea tayronata McCleery, 2011
- Eratoidea unionensis McCleery, 2011
- Eratoidea viequesa McCleery, 2011
- Eratoidea watsoni (Dall, 1881)

Species brought into synonymy

- Eratoidea brachia (Watson, 1886): synonym of Mesoginella brachia (Watson, 1886)
- Eratoidea microgonia (Dall, 1927): synonym of Cystiscus microgonia (Dall, 1927)
- Eratoidea scripta (Hinds, 1844): synonym of Cryptospira scripta (Hinds, 1844)
- Eratoidea strangei (Angas, 1877): synonym of Mesoginella strangei (Angas, 1877)
