= Cribrarula pellisserpentis =

Scientific classification
- Kingdom: Animalia
- Phylum: Mollusca
- Class: Gastropoda
- Subclass: Caenogastropoda
- Order: Littorinimorpha
- Family: Cypraeidae
- Genus: Cribrarula
- Species: C. pellisserpentis

Binomial name
- Cribrarula pellisserpentis Lorenz, 1999

Species of gastropod

Cribrarula pellisserpentis is a species of sea snail, a cowry, a marine gastropod mollusk in the family Cypraeidae, the cowries.

== Distribution ==
This species has been found off the coast of Madagascar.
