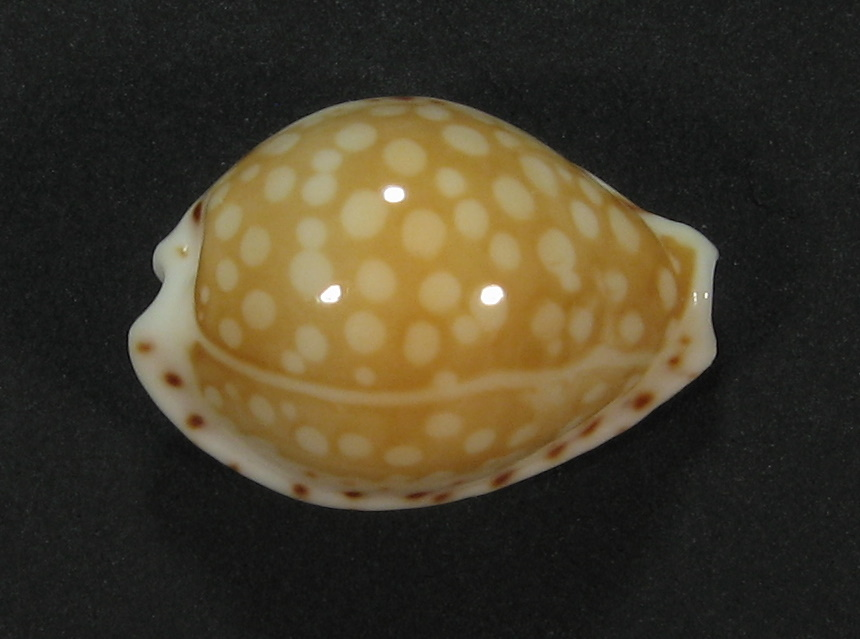

Scientific classification
- Kingdom: Animalia
- Phylum: Mollusca
- Class: Gastropoda
- Subclass: Caenogastropoda
- Order: Littorinimorpha
- Family: Cypraeidae
- Genus: Cribrarula
- Species: C. gaskoini

Binomial name
- Cribrarula gaskoini (Reeve, 1846)

Synonyms
- Cypraea gaskoini Reeve, 1846; Cypraea peasei Sowerby III, 1870; Cribrarula gaskoinii (Reeve, 1846); Cribrarula pellucida Taylor, 1916

= Cribrarula gaskoini =

Species of gastropod

Cribrarula gaskoini is a species of sea snail, a cowry, a marine gastropod mollusk in the family Cypraeidae, the cowries.

== Description ==
The shell size varies between 10 and 30 mm (0.39 and 1.18 in).

== Distribution ==
This species is distributed along Hawaii and the Fiji Islands. The distribution of cowries in the Indo-Pacific is not arbitrary. Fossil evidence and patterns of modern endemism in the central Pacific and Indian Oceans suggest that speciation occurred outside the geographical limits of the Malay Archipelago. Cribrarula gaskoini from the Hawaiian Islands is clearly related to C. cribraria, which is distributed across the Indo-Pacific region. It is one of the most rarely found cowries on the Kwajalein Islands, as many other islands throughout the pacific.

== Habitat ==
Found from shallow waters to depths of around 100 ft (30 m), it resides on cliffs and under ledges, hiding during the day and emerging at night to feed.
