= Archierato maugeriae =

Scientific classification
- Kingdom: Animalia
- Phylum: Mollusca
- Class: Gastropoda
- Subclass: Caenogastropoda
- Order: Littorinimorpha
- Superfamily: Cypraeoidea
- Family: Eratoidae
- Genus: Archierato
- Species: A. maugeriae

Binomial name
- Archierato maugeriae (Gray, 1832)

Synonyms
- Erato maugeriae J. E. Gray, 1832 (original combination); Hespererato maugeriae (J. E. Gray in G. B. Sowerby I, 1832)

Species of gastropod

Archierato maugeriae is a species of small sea snail, a marine gastropod mollusk in the family Eratoidae, the false cowries or trivias and allies.

== Distribution ==
This species is found in the Caribbean Sea from Florida to Panama.

== Description ==
The maximum recorded shell length is 6 mm.

== Habitat ==
Minimum recorded depth is 1.5 m. Maximum recorded depth is 120 m.
