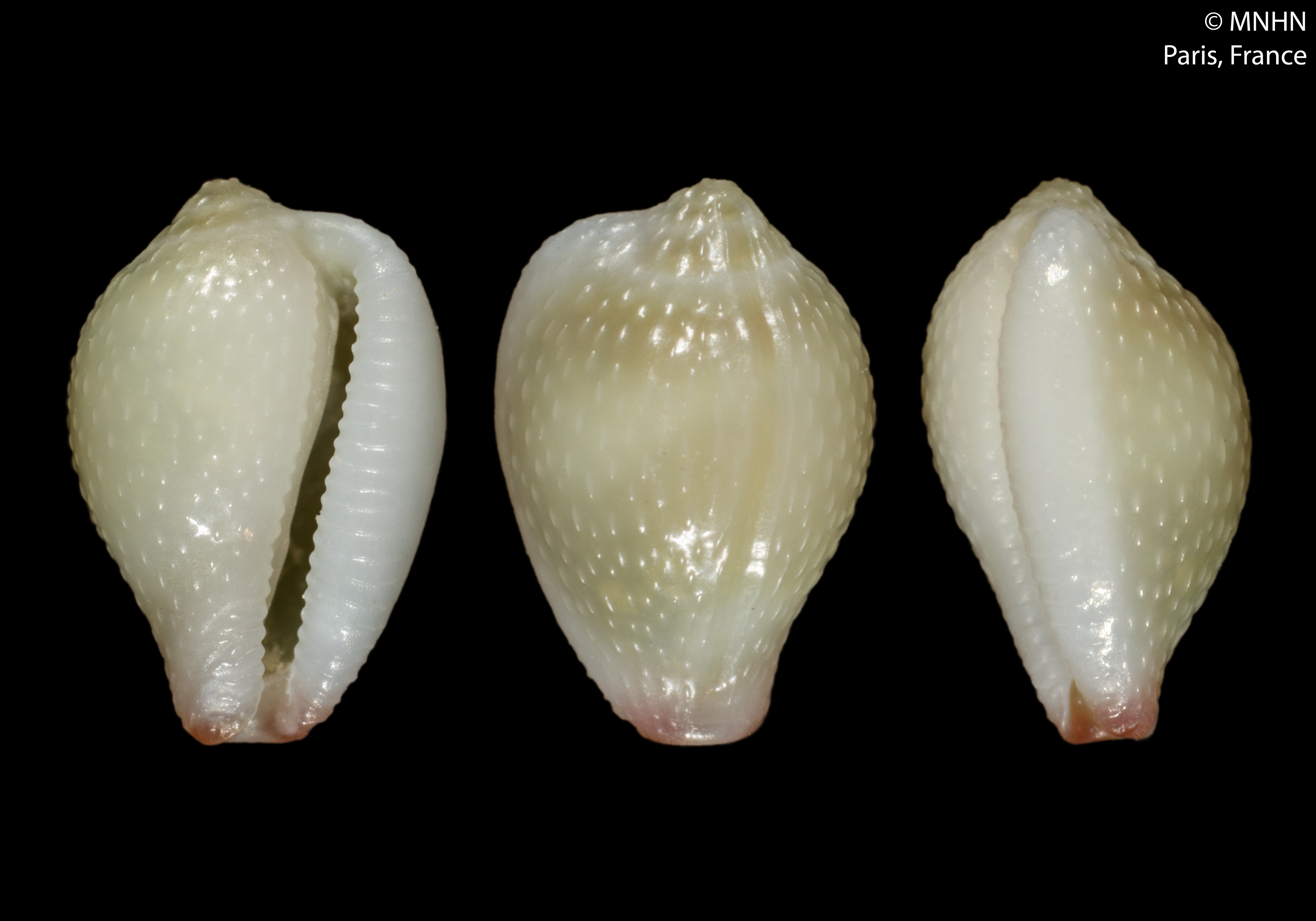
- Shell of Eratoena sulcifera (neotype at MNHN, Paris)

Scientific classification
- Kingdom: Animalia
- Phylum: Mollusca
- Class: Gastropoda
- Subclass: Caenogastropoda
- Order: Littorinimorpha
- Family: Eratoidae
- Genus: Eratoena
- Species: E. sulcifera

Binomial name
- Eratoena sulcifera (Gray in Sowerby I, 1832)

Synonyms
- Erato sulcifera Gray in Sowerby I, 1832 (basionym); Ovulum corrugatum Hinds, 1844; Proterato capensis Schilder, 1933; Proterato sulcifera (Gray in Sowerby I, 1832); Proterato (Eratoena) schmeltziana Crosse, 1867

= Eratoena sulcifera =

Species of gastropod

Eratoena sulcifera is a species of small sea snail, a marine gastropod mollusk in the family Eratoidae, the false cowries or trivias.

== Description ==
The shell size varies between 3 mm and 5 mm. It is typically cream, pink, or pale green in color, and sometimes faintly banded. The shell possesses a dorsal longitudinal groove that is often very indistinct as well as labial and columellar teeth.

== Distribution ==
This marine species occurs in the Indo-West Pacific. Its presence has been noted in French Polynesia and off the Aldabra Atoll. The type locality of this species is contained in the Cape of Good Hope, providing a reference point for its original description and geographical distribution.
