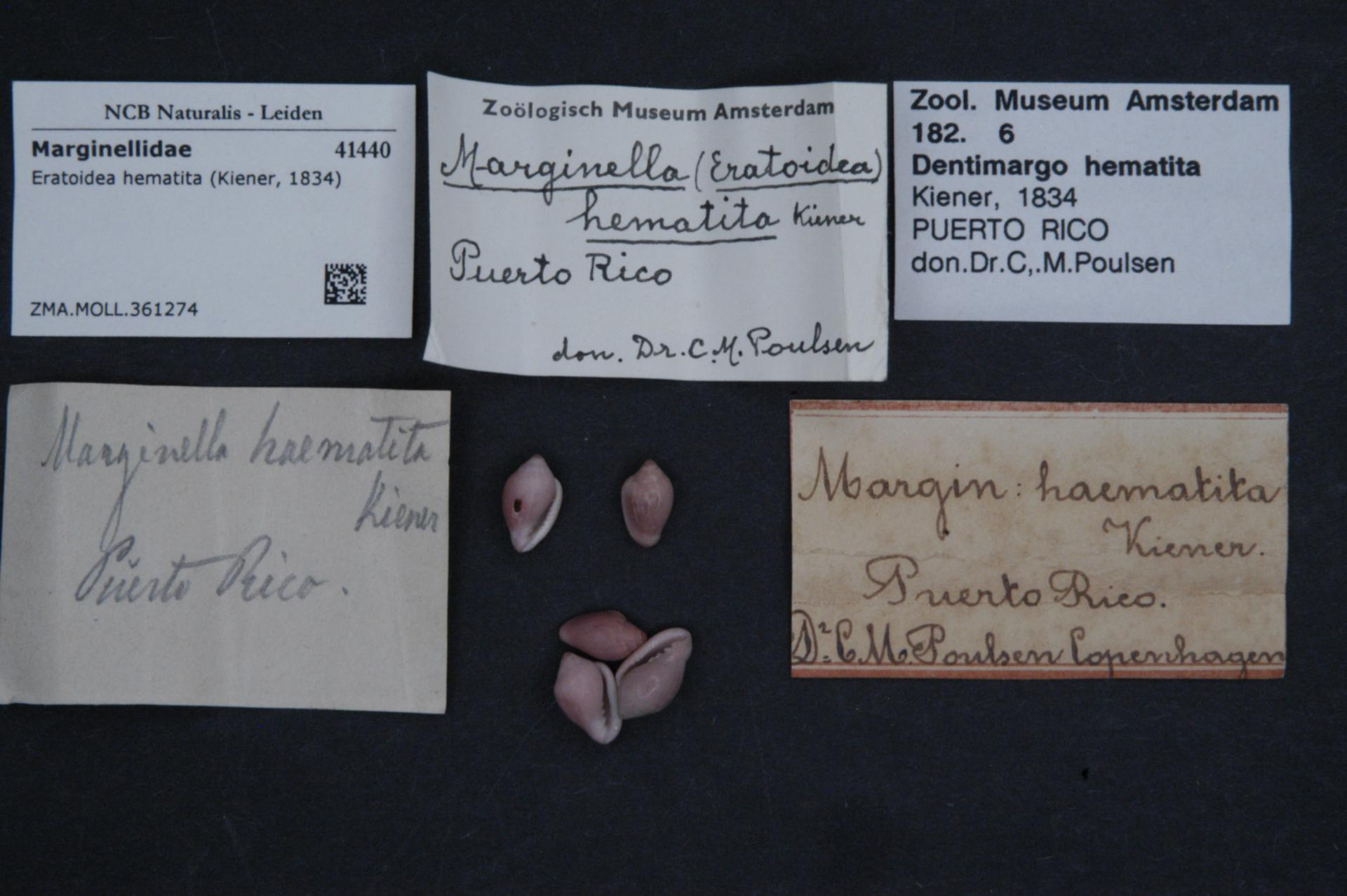

Scientific classification
- Kingdom: Animalia
- Phylum: Mollusca
- Class: Gastropoda
- Subclass: Caenogastropoda
- Order: Neogastropoda
- Family: Marginellidae
- Genus: Eratoidea
- Species: E. hematita

Binomial name
- Eratoidea hematita (Kiener, 1834)

= Eratoidea hematita =

Species of gastropod

Eratoidea hematita is a species of sea snail, a marine gastropod mollusk in the family Marginellidae, the margin snails.
