= Gibberula novemprovincialis =

Scientific classification
- Kingdom: Animalia
- Phylum: Mollusca
- Class: Gastropoda
- Subclass: Caenogastropoda
- Order: Neogastropoda
- Family: Cystiscidae
- Subfamily: Cystiscinae
- Genus: Gibberula
- Species: G. novemprovincialis

Binomial name
- Gibberula novemprovincialis (Yokoyama, 1928)

Synonyms
- Erato novemprovincialis Yokoyama, 1928

Species of gastropod

Gibberula novemprovincialis is a species of sea snail, a marine gastropod mollusk, in the family Cystiscidae.
