= Eratoidea watsoni =

Scientific classification
- Kingdom: Animalia
- Phylum: Mollusca
- Class: Gastropoda
- Subclass: Caenogastropoda
- Order: Neogastropoda
- Family: Marginellidae
- Genus: Eratoidea
- Species: E. watsoni

Binomial name
- Eratoidea watsoni (Dall, 1881)

Synonyms
- Hespererato pallida Oleinik, Petuch & Aley IV, 2012; Marginella watsoni Dall, 1881 (original combination)

Species of gastropod

Eratoidea watsoni is a species of sea snail, a marine gastropod mollusk in the family Marginellidae, the margin snails.
