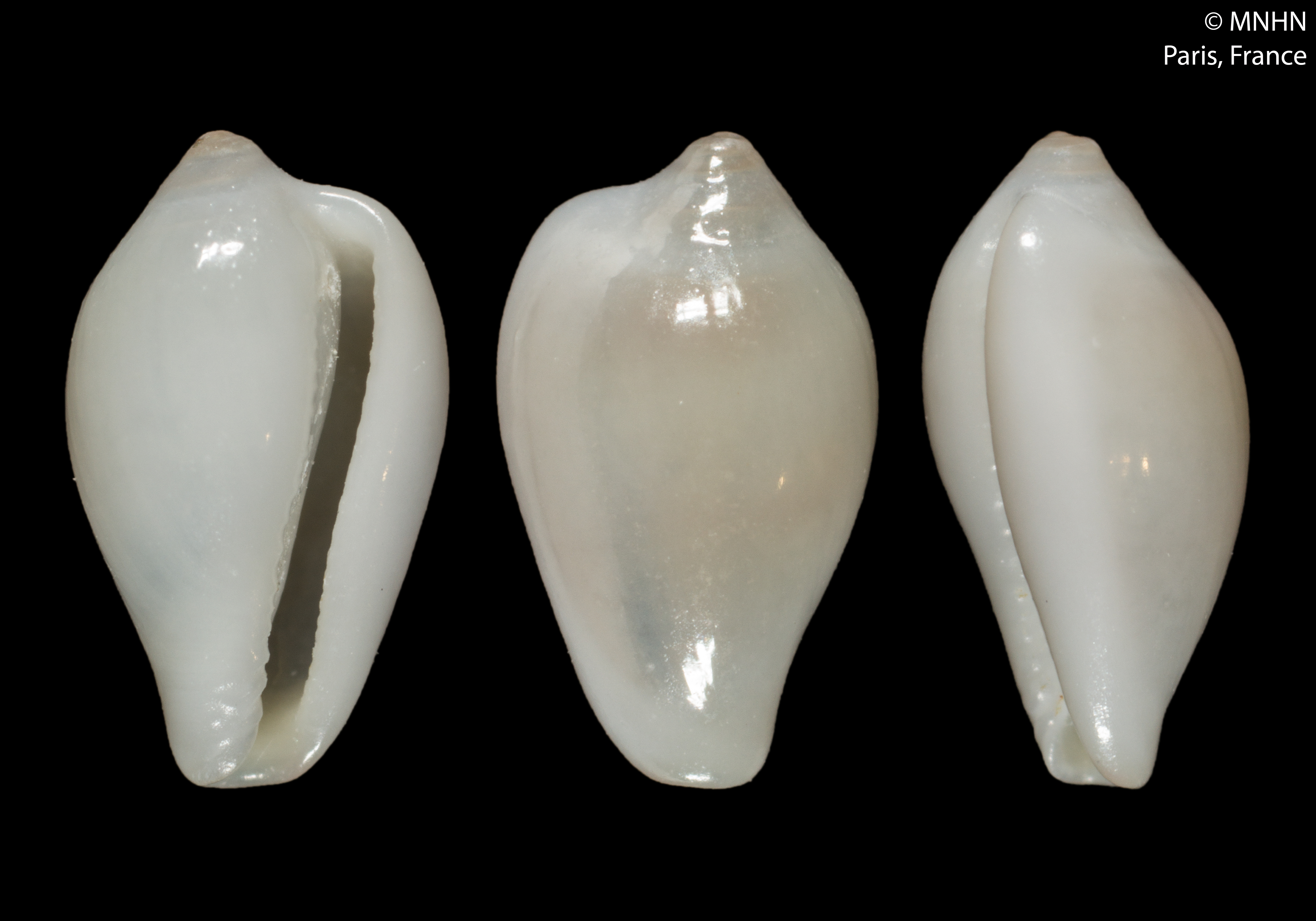
- Sulcerato recondita

Scientific classification
- Kingdom: Animalia
- Phylum: Mollusca
- Class: Gastropoda
- Subclass: Caenogastropoda
- Order: Littorinimorpha
- Family: Eratoidae
- Genus: Sulcerato
- Species: S. recondita

Binomial name
- Sulcerato recondita (Melvill & Standen, 1903)

Synonyms
- Erato edentula Bozzetti, 2009; Erato inhanbanensis Bozzetti, 2009; Erato recondita Melvill & Standen, 1903; Proterato recondita (Melvill & Standen, 1903)

= Sulcerato recondita =

Species of gastropod

Sulcerato recondita is a species of small sea snail, a marine gastropod mollusc in the family Triviidae, the false cowries or trivias.
