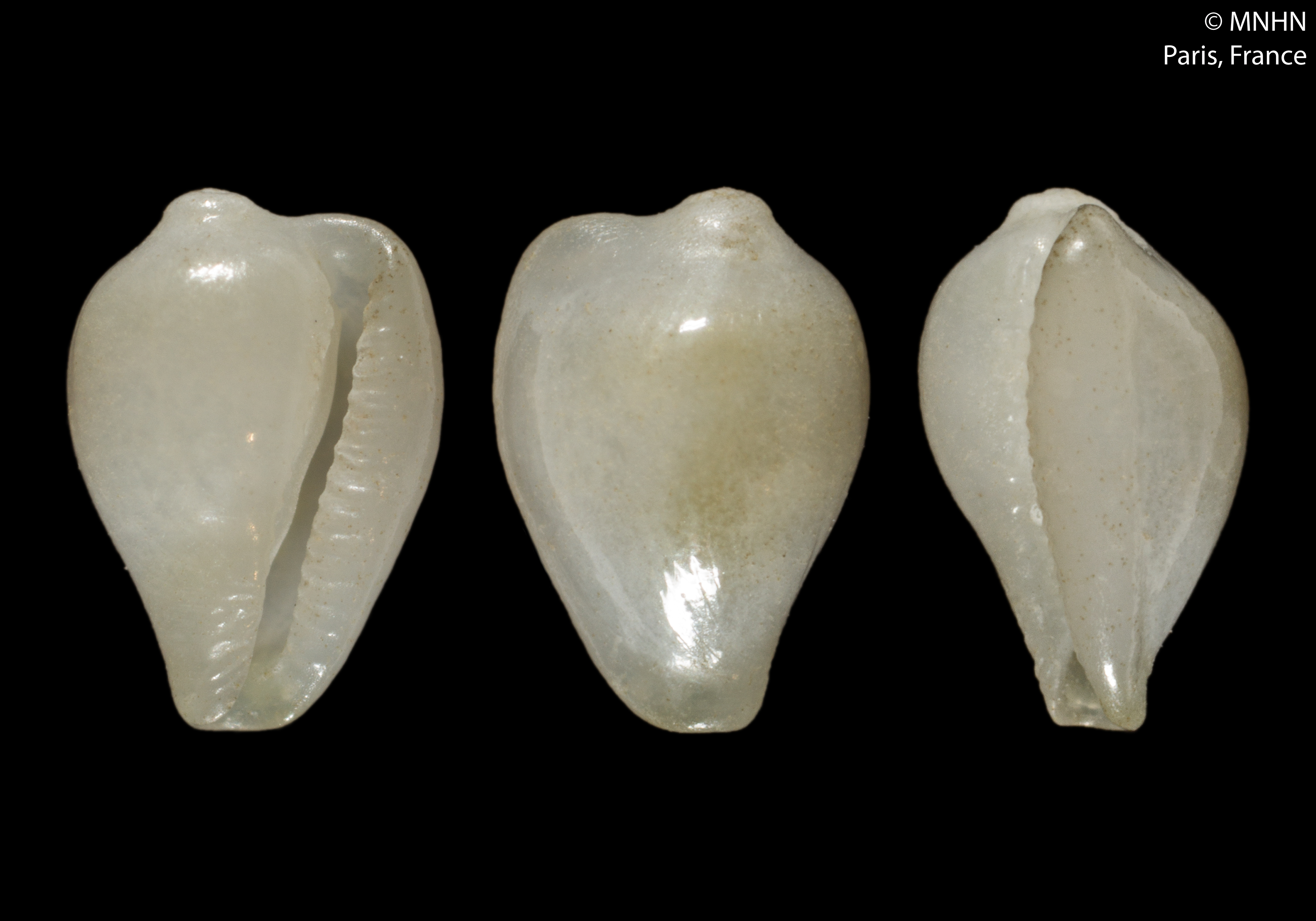
- Shell of Alaerato elizabethae (holotype at MNHN, Paris)

Scientific classification
- Kingdom: Animalia
- Phylum: Mollusca
- Class: Gastropoda
- Subclass: Caenogastropoda
- Order: Littorinimorpha
- Superfamily: Cypraeoidea
- Family: Eratoidae; Gill, 1871

Genera
- See text

Synonyms
- Eratoinae Gill, 1871; Eratotriviini Schilder, 1936 †; Johnstrupiini Schilder, 1939 †

= Eratoidae =

Family of gastropods

Eratoidae is a family of predatory sea snails, marine gastropods included in the superfamily Cypraeoidea.

== Genera ==
- Alaerato C. N. Cate, 1977
- Archierato Schilder, 1933
- † Bellerato Maxwell, 1992
- Caribeginella Espinosa & Ortea, 1998
- Cypraeerato Schilder, 1933
- Erato Risso, 1826
- Eratoena Iredale, 1935
- Eratopsis R. Hoernes, 1880
- † Eratotrivia Sacco, 1894
- Hespererato Schilder, 1933
- † Johnstrupia Ravn, 1933
- Lachryma Gray, 1832
- Notoficula Thiele, 1917
- Praealaerato Fehse, 2018 †
- Proterato Schilder, 1927
- Sulcerato Finlay, 1930

Synonyms

- Subfamily Eratoinae Gill, 1871 accepted as Eratoidae Gill, 1871
- Tribe Eratotriviini Schilder, 1936 † accepted as Eratoidae Gill, 1871
- Tribe Johnstrupiini Schilder, 1939 † accepted as Eratoidae Gill, 1871
- Genus Proerato [sic] accepted as Proterato Schilder, 1927 (misspelling)
