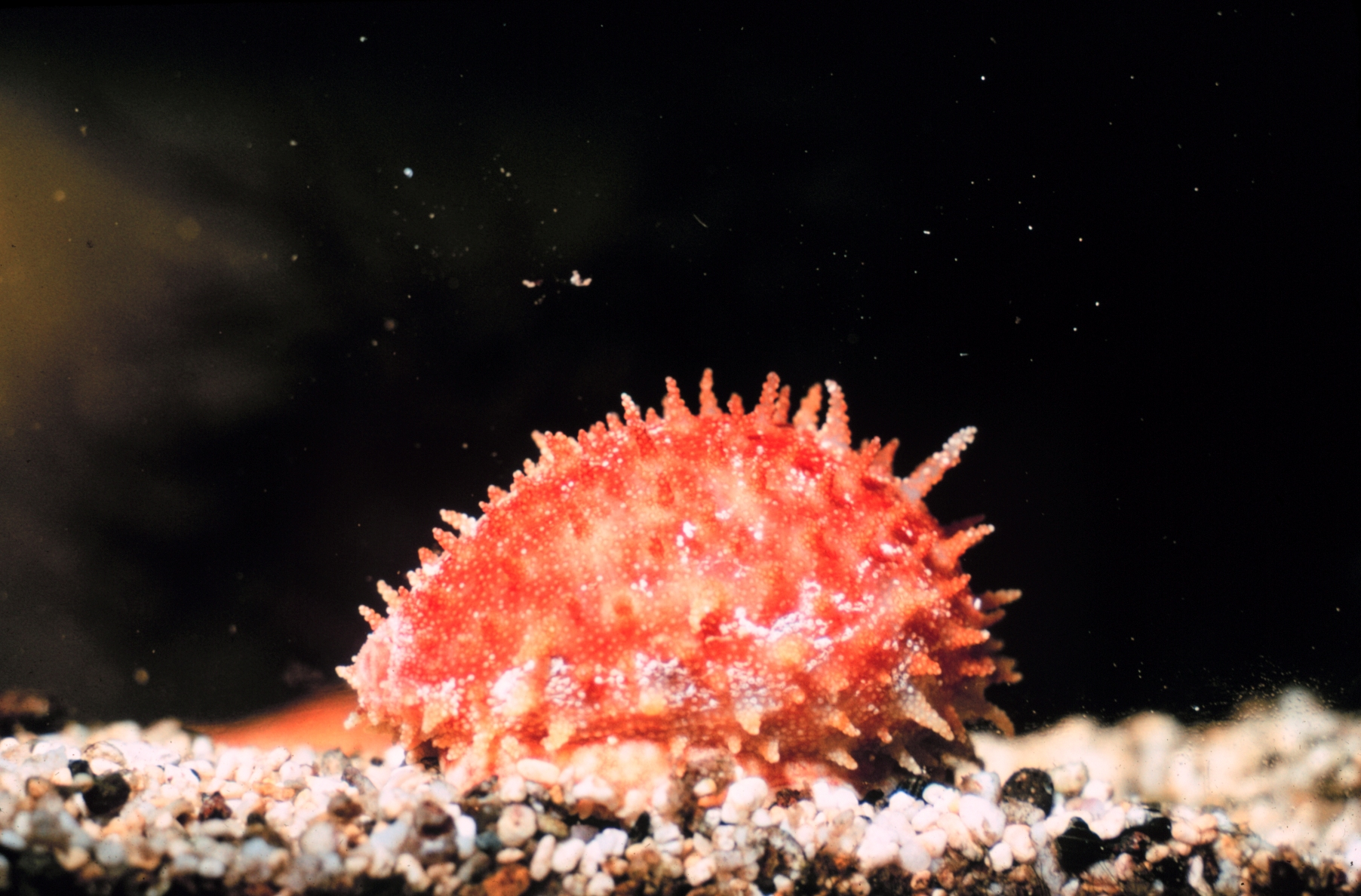
- A live cowry Cypraea chinensis, with its mantle fully extended, head end to the left

Scientific classification
- Kingdom: Animalia
- Phylum: Mollusca
- Class: Gastropoda
- Subclass: Caenogastropoda
- Order: Littorinimorpha
- Superfamily: Cypraeoidea; Rafinesque, 1815

Families
- See text

Synonyms
- Velutinoidea

= Cypraeoidea =

Superfamily of gastropods

Cypraeoidea, the cowries and cowry allies, is a superfamily of sea snails, marine gastropods included in the order Littorinimorpha. This superfamily had been called Cypraeacea and was named by Rafinesque in 1815.

== Shell description ==
This superfamily of sea snails have adult shells which do not look like typical gastropod shells because the spire of the shell is not visible in adults, instead the shells are: often quite rounded in shape, varying from globular to elongate, and with a long, very narrow, aperture which is sometimes toothed. The snails in these families have no operculum.

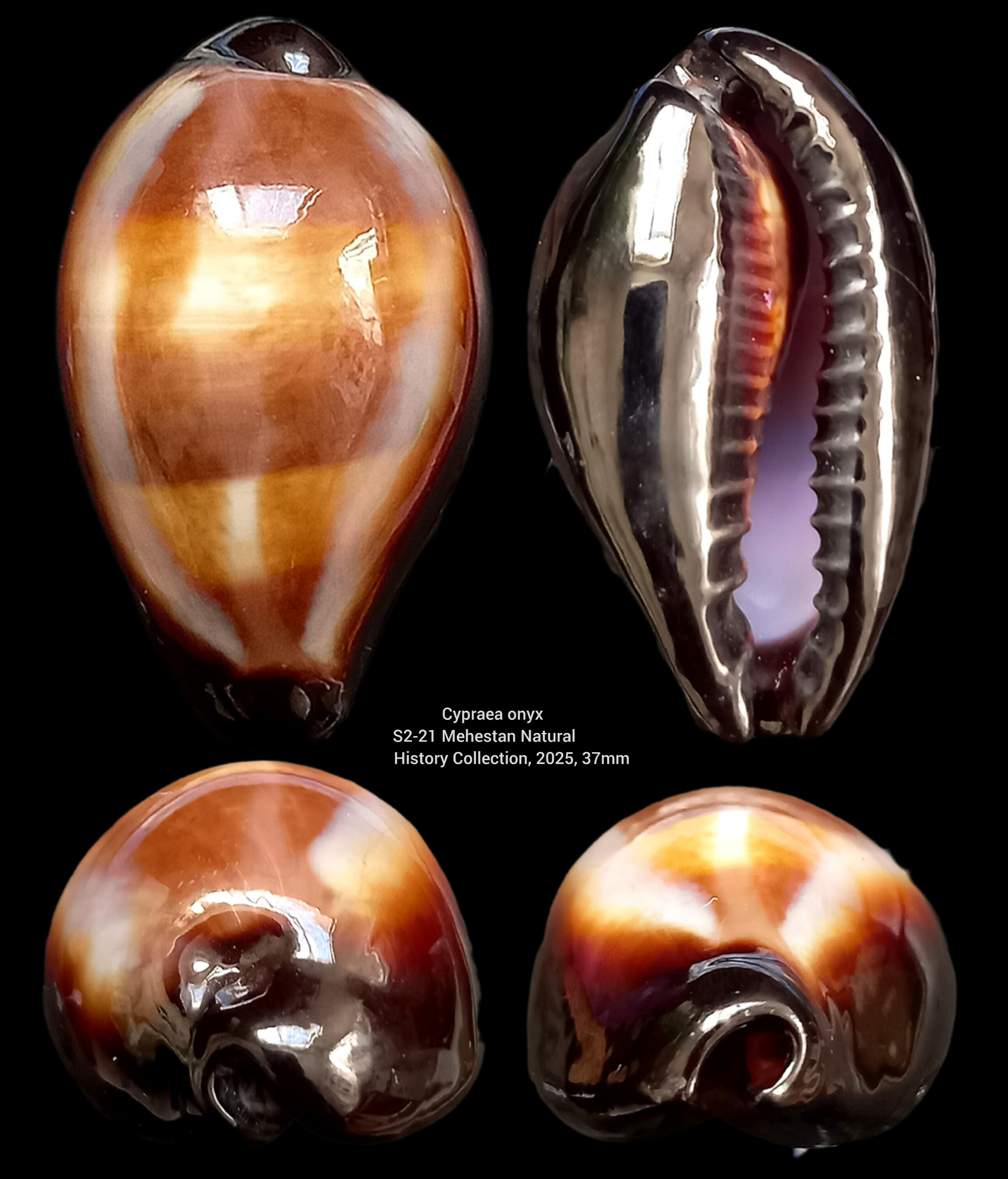
Erronea onyx S2-21 37mm

The shells of almost every species in this superfamily are very smooth and shiny, and this is because in the living animal, the shell is nearly always fully covered with the mantle.

The largest known fossil cowry was Gisortia gigantiea Munster, 1828 which reached a length of 350mm. The largest modern cowry is the Atlantic Deer Cowry (Macrocypraea cervus) at up to 190mm. The largest known cowry from any extant subfamily or genus was the Australian cowry Zoila (Gigantocypraea) gigas (McCoy, 1867) at about 247mm.

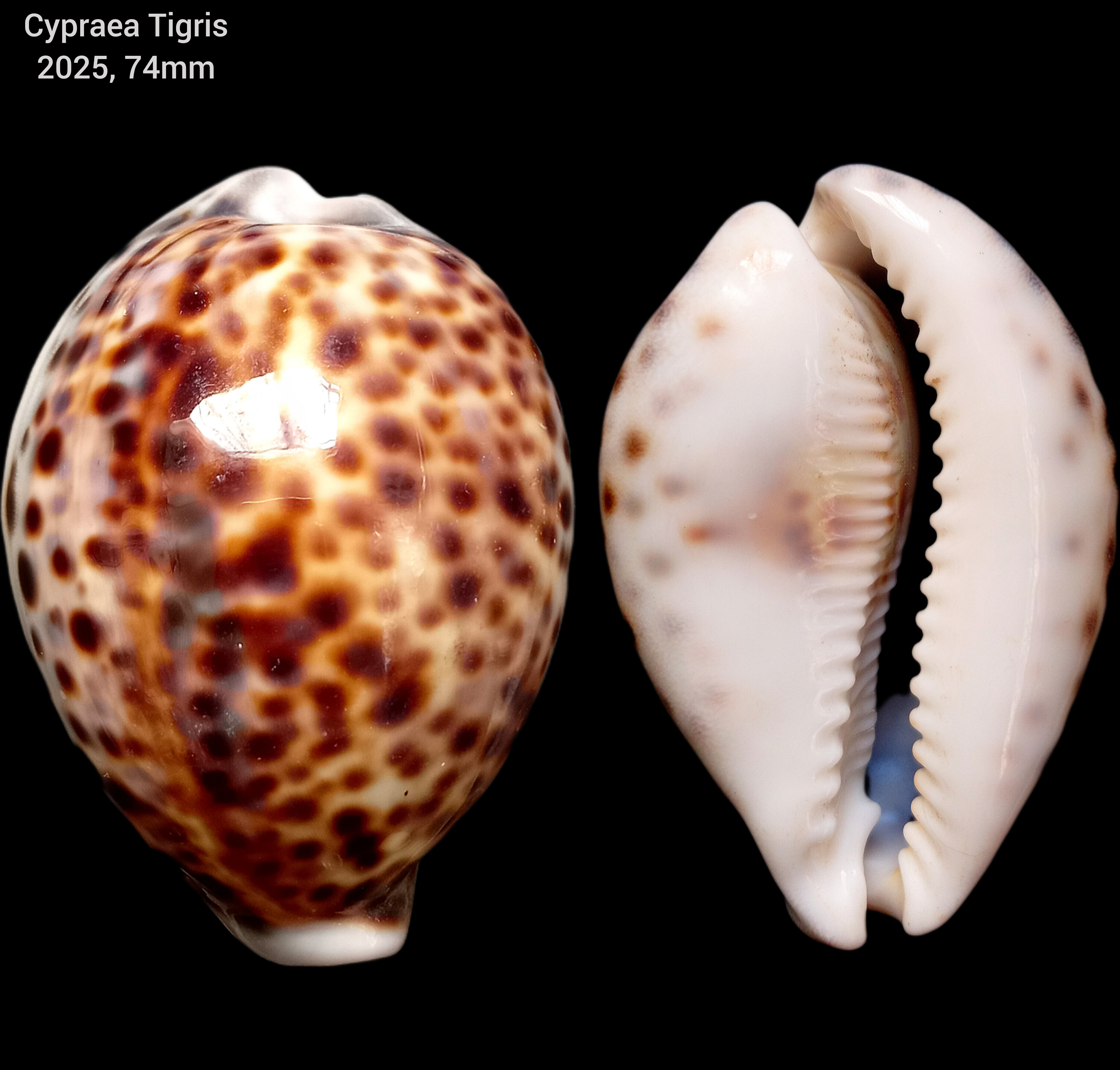
Cypraea Tigris

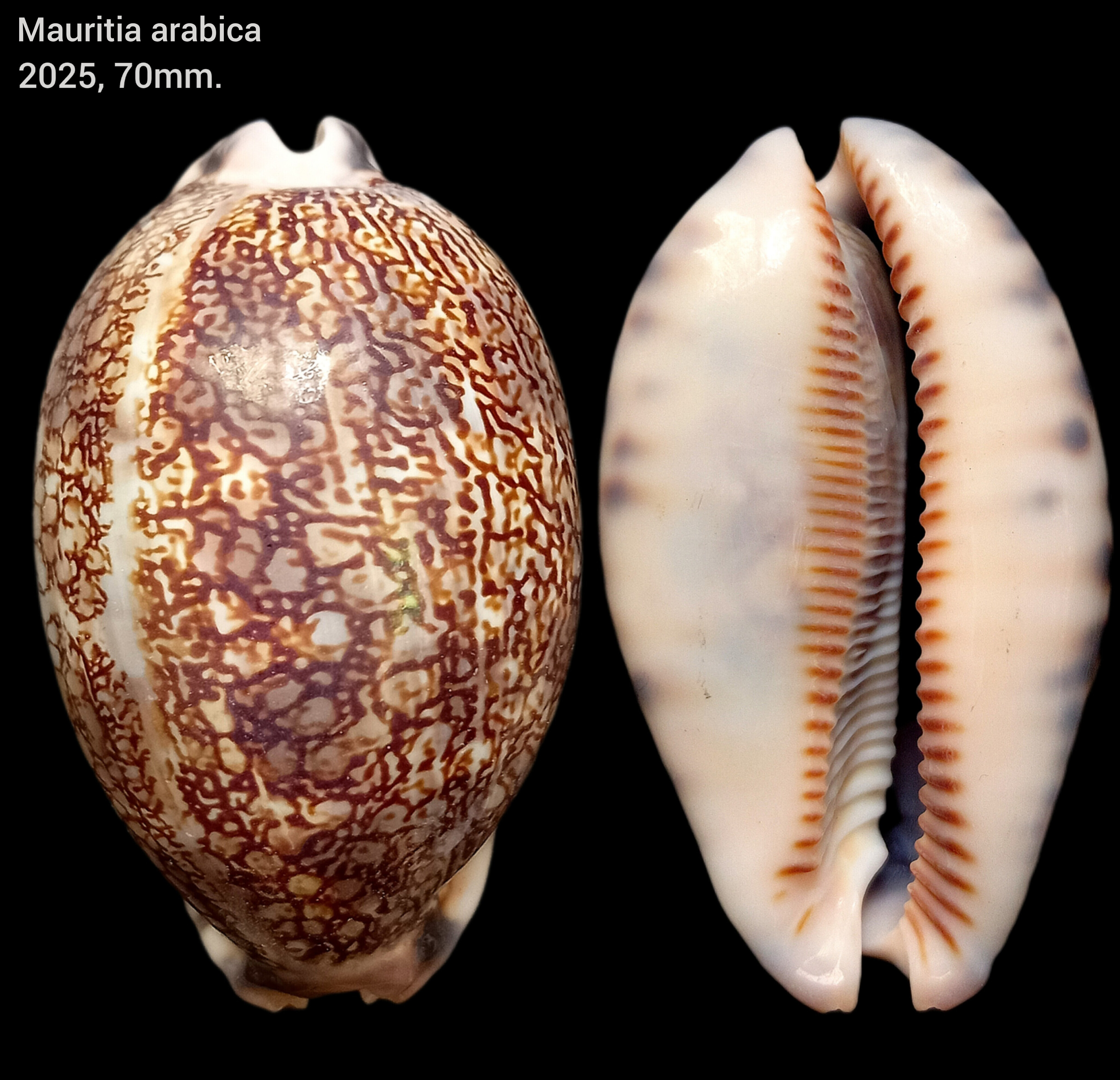
Mauritia arabica

== Nomenclature ==
This superfamily used to be known as Cypraeacea. Prior to the recent ruling by the ICZN, many invertebrate superfamily names ended in the suffix -acea, or -aceae, not -gidea as now required according to ICZN article 29.2. The suffix -oidea used to be used for some subclasses and superorders, where it is still found. In much of the older literature including Keen 1958, gastropod superfamilies are written with the suffix -acea.

== Taxonomy ==
=== 2005 taxonomy ===
The following two subfamilies were recognized in the taxonomy of Bouchet & Rocroi (2005):

- Cypraeidae
- Ovulidae

=== 2007 taxonomy ===
Fehse (2007) elevated the subfamily Pediculariinae to the family Pediculariidae, and the tribe Eocypraeini to the family Eocypraeidae. Both of these groups were removed from the Ovulidae and raised to family level, based on research on their morphological and molecular phylogenic qualities. Families within Cypraeoidea are as follows:

- Cypraeidae
- Eratoidae Gill, 1871
- Ovulidae
- Triviidae Troschel, 1863
- Velutinidae Gray, 1840

Synonyms

- Amphiperatidae Gray, 1853: synonym of Ovulidae J. Fleming, 1822
- Eocypraeidae : synonym of Eocypraeinae Schilder, 1924
- Lamellariidae d'Orbigny, 1841: synonym of Lamellariinae d'Orbigny, 1841
- Pediculariidae Gray, 1853: synonym of Pediculariinae Gray, 1853

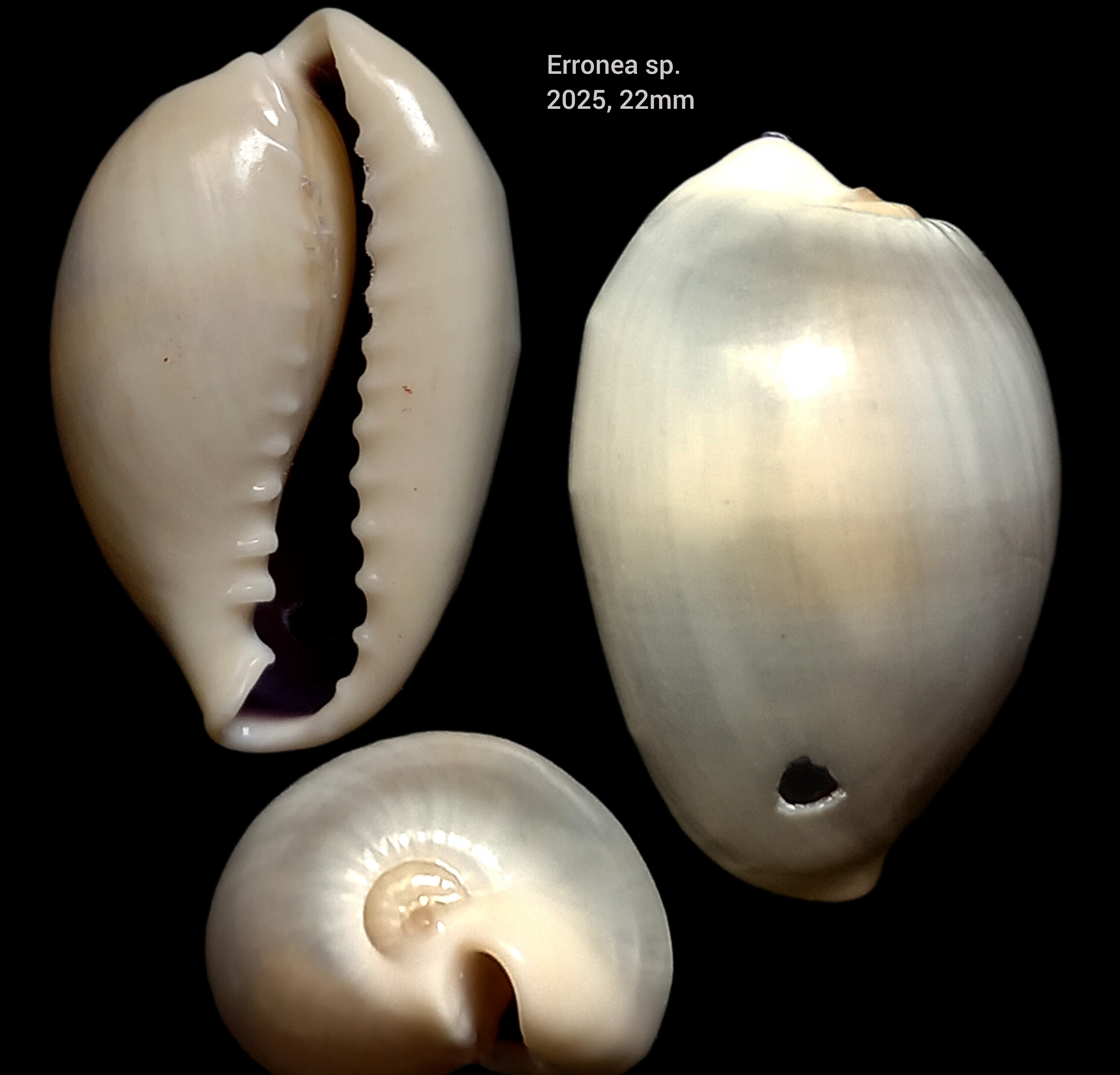
Erronea sp

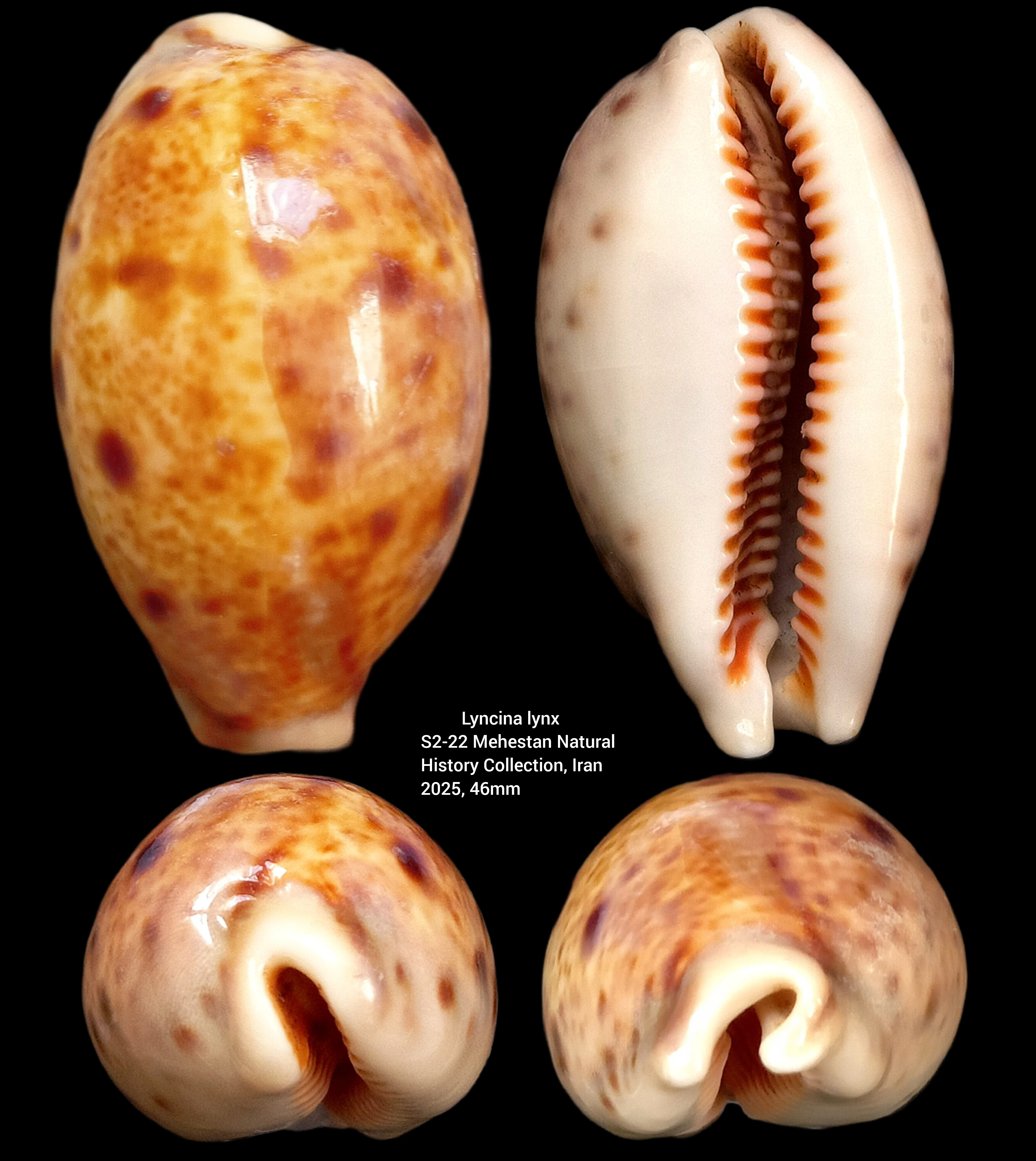
Lyncina lynx S2-22 46mm
