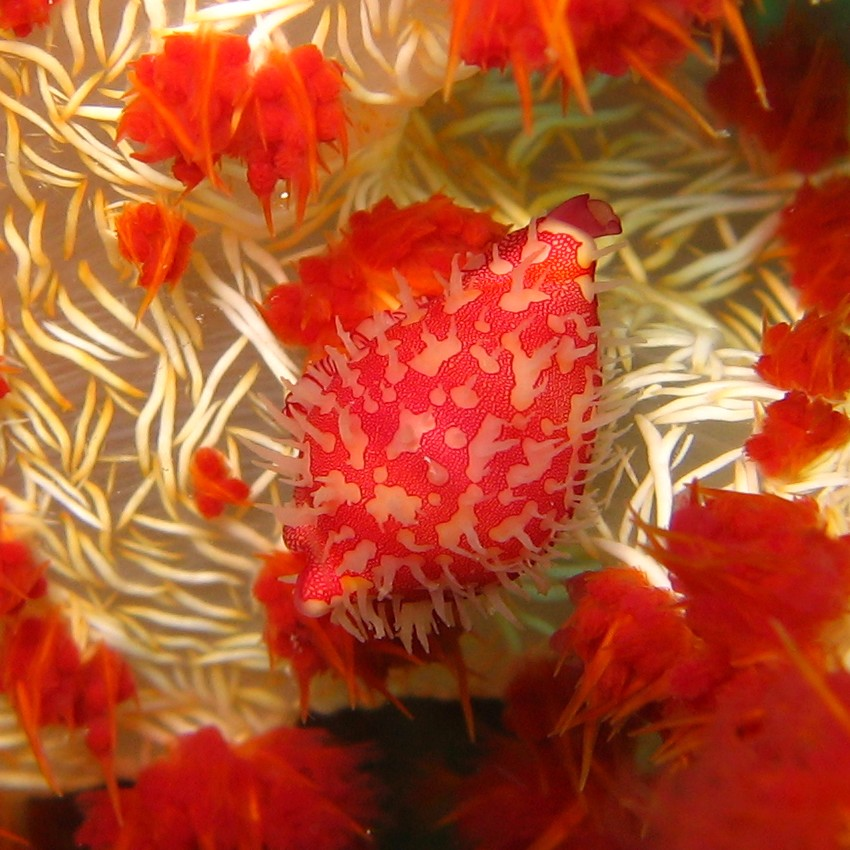
- Live individual of Primovula roseomaculata in situ, head end towards the upper right

Scientific classification
- Kingdom: Animalia
- Phylum: Mollusca
- Class: Gastropoda
- Subclass: Caenogastropoda
- Order: Littorinimorpha
- Family: Ovulidae
- Genus: Primovula; Thiele, 1925

Synonyms
- Primovula (Primovula) Thiele, 1925

= Primovula =

Genus of gastropods

Primovula is a genus of sea snails, marine gastropod mollusks in the family Ovulidae, the false cowries.

== Species ==
Species within the genus Primovula include:

- Primovula astra Omi & Iino, 2005
- Primovula beckeri (Sowerby III, 1900)
- Primovula fulguris (Azuma & Cate, 1971)
- Primovula panthera Omi, 2008
- Primovula roseomaculata (Schepman, 1909)
- Primovula rosewateri (Cate, 1973)
- Primovula santacarolinensis Cate, 1978
- Primovula tadashigei (Cate, 1973)
- Primovula tropica Schilder, 1931
- Primovula uvula Cate, 1978

Species brought into synonymy

- Primovula adriatica Allan, 1956: synonym of Pseudosimnia adriatica (Sowerby I, 1828)
- Primovula aureola Fehse, 2002: synonym of Crenavolva aureola (Fehse, 2002)
- Primovula azumai Cate, 1970: synonym of Dentiovula azumai (Cate, 1970)
- Primovula bellica Cate, 1973: synonym of Cuspivolva bellica (Cate, 1973)
- Primovula bellocqae Cardin, 1997: synonym of Pseudosimnia juanjosensii (Pérez & Gómez, 1987)
- Primovula carnea (Poiret, 1789): synonym of Pseudosimnia carnea (Poiret, 1789)
- Primovula cavanaghi Allan, 1956: synonym of Globovula cavanaghi (Iredale, 1931)
- Primovula celzardi Fehse, 2008: synonym of Cuspivolva celzardi (Fehse, 2008)
- Primovula coarctaca Schilder, 1941: synonym of Prosimnia semperi (Weinkauff, 1881)
- Primovula colobica Azuma & Cate, 1971: synonym of Dentiovula colobica (Azuma & Cate, 1971)
- Primovula concinna Schilder, 1932: synonym of Procalpurnus semistriatus (Pease, 1862)
- Primovula dautzenbergi Schilder, 1931: synonym of Diminovula dautzenbergi (Schilder, 1931)
- Primovula diaphana Liltved, 1987: synonym of Pseudosimnia diaphana (Liltved, 1987)
- Primovula dondani Cate, 1964: synonym of Serratovolva dondani (Cate, 1964)
- Primovula dubia Cate, 1973: synonym of Primovula fulguris (Azuma & Cate, 1971)
- Primovula formosa Schilder, 1941: synonym of Crenavolva traillii (A. Adams, 1855)
- Primovula fructicum (Reeve, 1865): synonym of Prionovolva wilsoniana Cate, 1973: synonym of Prionovolva brevis (Sowerby I, 1828)
- Primovula fruticum (Reeve, 1865): synonym of Prionovolva brevis (Sowerby I, 1828)
- Primovula fumikoae Azuma & Cate, 1971: synonym of Sandalia triticea (Lamarck, 1810)
- Primovula habui Cate, 1973: synonym of Cuspivolva habui (Cate, 1973)
- Primovula helenae Cate, 1973: synonym of Cuspivolva helenae (Cate, 1973)
- Primovula horai Cardin, 1994: synonym of Dentiovula horai (Cardin, 1994)
- Primovula horimasarui Cate & Azuma, 1971: synonym of Hiatavolva coarctata (Sowerby II in A. Adams & Reeve, 1848)
- Primovula kurodai Cate & Azuma in Cate, 1973: synonym of Primovula roseomaculata (Schepman, 1909)
- Primovula luna Omi, 2007: synonym of Pseudosimnia diaphana (Liltved, 1987)
- Primovula mariae Schilder, 1941: synonym of Dentiovula mariae (Schilder, 1941)
- Primovula mucronata Azuma & Cate, 1971: synonym of Cuspivolva mucronata (Azuma & Cate, 1971)
- Primovula myrakeenae Azuma & Cate, 1971: synonym of Dentiovula azumai (Cate, 1970)
- Primovula narinosa Cate, 1973: synonym of Cuspivolva narinosa (Cate, 1973)
- Primovula oryza Omi & Clover, 2005: synonym of Dentiovula oryza (Omi & Clover, 2005)
- Primovula platysia Cate, 1973: synonym of Cuspivolva platysia (Cate, 1973)
- Primovula pyriformis Allan, 1956: synonym of Diminovula alabaster (Reeve, 1865)
- Primovula rhodia Schilder, 1932: synonym of Simnia aperta (Sowerby II, 1849)
- Primovula rhodia (A. Adams, 1854): synonym of Sandalia triticea (Lamarck, 1810)
- Primovula rutherfordiana Cate, 1973: synonym of Dentiovula rutherfordiana (Cate, 1973)
- Primovula singularis Cate, 1973: synonym of Cuspivolva singularis (Cate, 1973)
- Primovula sinomaris Cate, 1973: synonym of Primovula roseomaculata (Schepman, 1909)
- Primovula solemi Cate, 1973: synonym of Pseudosimnia vanhyningi (M. Smith, 1940)
- Primovula tigris Yamamoto, 1971: synonym of Cuspivolva tigris (Yamamoto, 1971)
- Primovula tosaensis Azuma & Cate, 1971: synonym of Dissona tosaensis (Azuma & Cate, 1971)
- Primovula tropica Schilder, 1941: synonym of Primovula tropica Schilder, 1931
- Primovula vanhyningi M. Smith, 1940: synonym of Pseudosimnia vanhyningi (M. Smith, 1940)
- Primovula virgo Azuma & Cate, 1971: synonym of Crenavolva virgo (Azuma & Cate, 1971)
