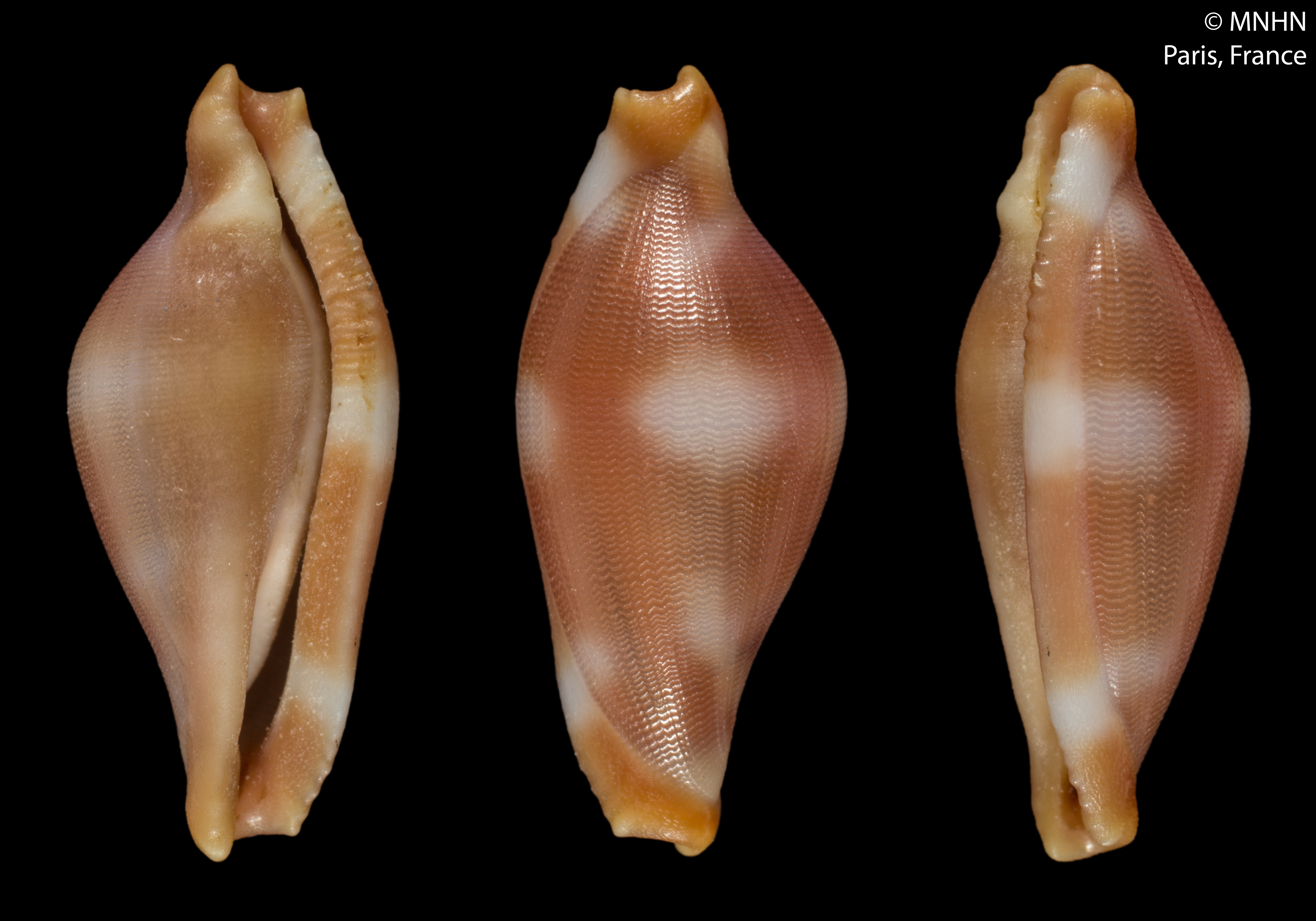
- Shell of Crenavolva janae (holotype at MNHN, Paris)

Scientific classification
- Kingdom: Animalia
- Phylum: Mollusca
- Class: Gastropoda
- Subclass: Caenogastropoda
- Order: Littorinimorpha
- Superfamily: Cypraeoidea
- Family: Ovulidae
- Genus: Crenavolva; Cate, 1973

Type species
- Ovulum striatulum G. B. Sowerby I, 1828

Synonyms
- Crenovolva [sic]; Crenavolva (Crenavolva) C. N. Cate, 1973

= Crenavolva =

Genus of gastropods

Crenavolva is a genus of sea snails, marine gastropod mollusks in the subfamily Eocypraeinae of the family Ovulidae.

== Species ==
Species within the genus Crenavolva include:

- Crenavolva aureola (Fehse, 2002)
- Crenavolva cruenta Gowlett-Holmes & Holmes, 1989
- Crenavolva frumentum (G. B. Sowerby I, 1828)
- Crenavolva grovesi Lorenz & Fehse, 2009
- Crenavolva guidoi Fehse, 2002
- Crenavolva janae Lorenz & Fehse, 2009
- Crenavolva leopardus Fehse, 2002
- Crenavolva marmorata Fehse, 2007
- Crenavolva martini Fehse, 1999
- Crenavolva matsumiyai Azuma, 1974
- Crenavolva nanshaensis Ma & Zhang, 1996
- Crenavolva philippei Lorenz & Fehse, 2009
- Crenavolva striatula (Sowerby I, 1828)
- Crenavolva tinctura (Garrard, 1963)
- Crenavolva tokuoi Azuma, 1989
- Crenavolva traillii (A. Adams, 1855)
- Crenavolva virgo (Azuma & Cate, 1971)
- Crenavolva vitrea (Omi & Iino, 2005)

Species brought into synonymy

- Crenavolva azumai (Cate, 1970): synonym of Dentiovula azumai (Cate, 1970)
- Crenavolva chiapponii Lorenz & Fehse, 2009: synonym of Crenavolva aureola (Fehse, 2002)
- Crenavolva chinensis Qi & Ma, 1983: synonym of Cuspivolva allynsmithi (Cate, 1978)
- Crenavolva conspicua Cate, 1975: synonym of Rotaovula septemmacula (Azuma, 1974)
- Crenavolva curiosa Cate, 1973: synonym of Dentiovula azumai (Cate, 1970)
- Crenavolva cuspis Cate, 1973: synonym of Cuspivolva cuspis (Cate, 1973)
- Crenavolva dondani (Cate, 1964): synonym of Serratovolva dondani (Cate, 1964)
- Crenavolva draperi Cate & Azuma in Cate, 1973: synonym of Cuspivolva draperi Cate & Azuma in Cate, 1973
- Crenavolva imitabilis Cate, 1973: synonym of Serratovolva dondani (Cate, 1964)
- Crenavolva mucronata (Azuma & Cate, 1971): synonym of Cuspivolva mucronata (Azuma & Cate, 1971)
- Crenavolva myrakeenae (Azuma & Cate, 1971): synonym of Dentiovula azumai (Cate, 1970)
- Crenavolva ostheimerae Cate, 1973: synonym of Cuspivolva ostheimerae (Cate, 1973)
- Crenavolva periopsis Cate, 1978: synonym of Crenavolva virgo (Azuma & Cate, 1971)
- Crenavolva rosewateri Cate, 1973: synonym of Primovula rosewateri (Cate, 1973)
- Crenavolva rostella Cate, 1973: synonym of Cuspivolva singularis (Cate, 1973)
- Crenavolva testudiana (Cate, 1978): synonym of Sandalia meyeriana (Cate, 1973)
- Crenavolva tigris (Yamamoto, 1971): synonym of Cuspivolva tigris (Yamamoto, 1971)
