= Primovula tropica =

Scientific classification
- Kingdom: Animalia
- Phylum: Mollusca
- Class: Gastropoda
- Subclass: Caenogastropoda
- Order: Littorinimorpha
- Family: Ovulidae
- Genus: Primovula
- Species: P. tropica

Binomial name
- Primovula tropica Schilder, 1931

Synonyms
- Primovula beckeri tropica Schilder, 1931; Primovula tropica Schilder, 1941

Species of gastropod

Primovula tropica is a species of sea snail, a marine gastropod mollusk in the family Ovulidae: the ovulids, cowry allies, or false cowries.
