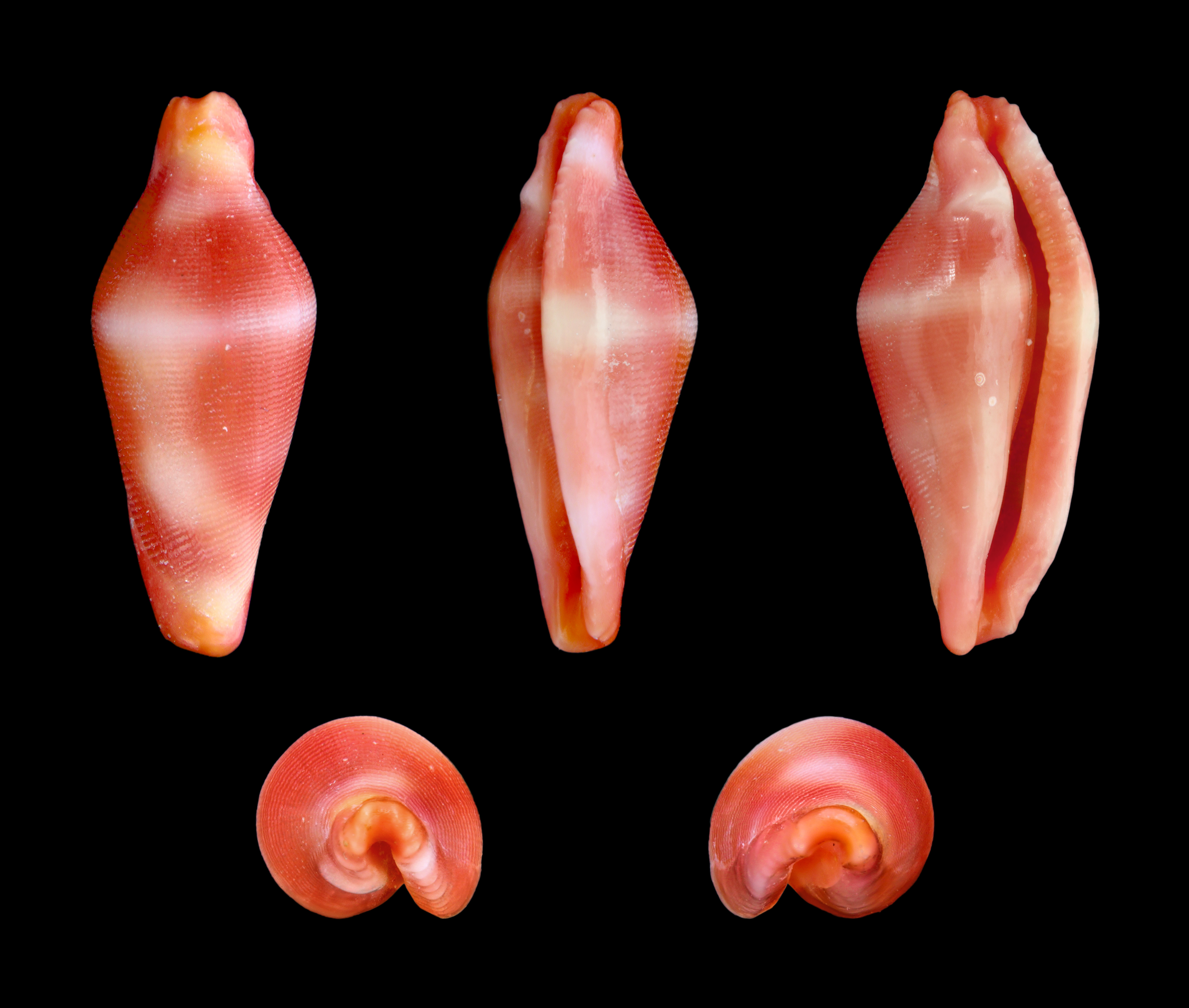
- shell of Dentiovula masaoi

Scientific classification
- Kingdom: Animalia
- Phylum: Mollusca
- Class: Gastropoda
- Subclass: Caenogastropoda
- Order: Littorinimorpha
- Family: Ovulidae
- Genus: Dentiovula; Habe, 1961

Synonyms
- Dentivolva Haben 1961

= Dentiovula =

Genus of gastropods

Dentiovula is a genus of sea snails, marine gastropod mollusks in the family Ovulidae.

== Species ==
Species within the genus Dentiovula include:

- Dentiovula azumai (Cate, 1970)
- Dentiovula colobica (Azuma & Cate, 1971)
- Dentiovula deforgesi Lorenz & Fehse, 2009
- Dentiovula dorsuosa (Hinds, 1844)
- Dentiovula eizoi Cate & Azuma in Cate, 1973
- Dentiovula horai (Cardin, 1994)
- Dentiovula mariae (Schilder, 1941)
- Dentiovula masaoi Cate, 1973
- Dentiovula oryza (Omi & Clover, 2005)
- Dentiovula parvita Azuma, 1974
- Dentiovula rutherfordiana (Cate, 1973)
