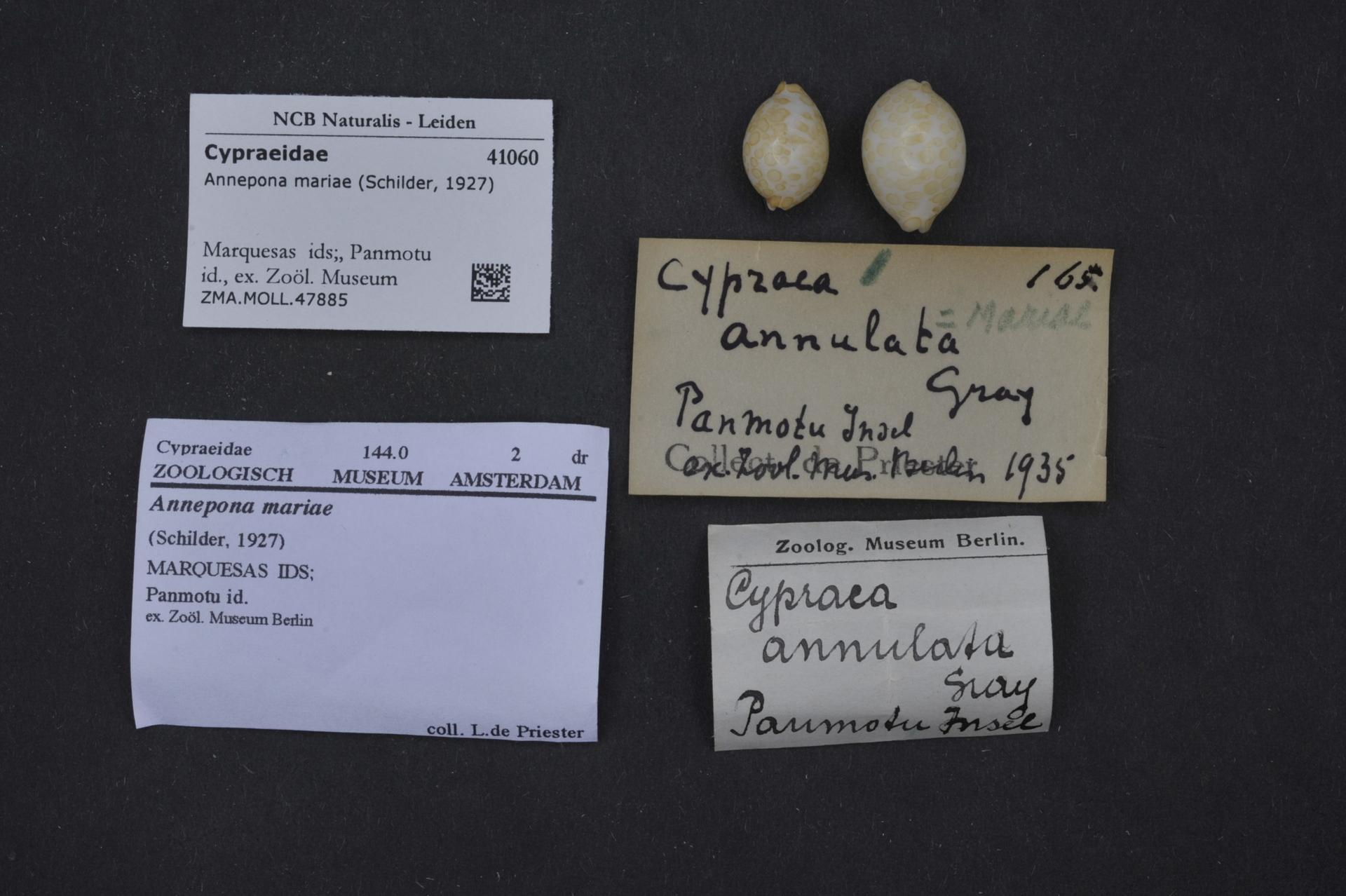
- Annepona mariae shell

Scientific classification
- Kingdom: Animalia
- Phylum: Mollusca
- Class: Gastropoda
- Subclass: Caenogastropoda
- Order: Littorinimorpha
- Family: Cypraeidae
- Genus: Annepona
- Species: A. mariae

Binomial name
- Annepona mariae (Schilder, 1927)

Synonyms
- Cypraea annulata Gray, J.E., 1825; Cypraea mariae Schilder, 1927; Cypraea mantellum Walls, J.G. & C.M. Burgess, 1980; Pustularia mariae Schilder, 1927 (original combination)

= Annepona mariae =

Species of mollusc

Annepona mariae is a species of sea snail, a cowry, a marine gastropod mollusk in the family Cypraeidae, the cowries. The species was named after German malacologist Maria Schilder.

== Description ==
The oval, porcellaneous shell is 9–20 mm in size. It is white in color with small yellow or olive blotches in a ring on the dorsum and on the sides. The extremities of the shell are hardly produced.

== Distribution ==
This species occurs from eastern Africa to northern Australia, the Philippines, the central Pacific Ocean, including the Solomons, Tonga, Hawaii and the Tuamotu Archipelago.
