= Primovula fulguris =

Scientific classification
- Kingdom: Animalia
- Phylum: Mollusca
- Class: Gastropoda
- Subclass: Caenogastropoda
- Order: Littorinimorpha
- Family: Ovulidae
- Genus: Primovula
- Species: P. fulguris

Binomial name
- Primovula fulguris (Azuma & Cate, 1971)

Synonyms
- Primovula dubia Cate, 1973; Pseudosimnia fulguris Azuma & Cate, 1971

Species of gastropod

Primovula fulguris is a species of sea snail, a marine gastropod mollusk in the family Ovulidae, the ovulids, cowry allies or false cowries.
