= Serratovolva minabeensis =

Scientific classification
- Kingdom: Animalia
- Phylum: Mollusca
- Class: Gastropoda
- Subclass: Caenogastropoda
- Order: Littorinimorpha
- Family: Ovulidae
- Genus: Serratovolva
- Species: S. minabeensis

Binomial name
- Serratovolva minabeensis Cate, 1975

Species of gastropod

Serratovolva minabeensis is a species of sea snail, a marine gastropod mollusk in the family Ovulidae, the ovulids, cowry allies or false cowries.

The Serratovolva Minabeensis resides around the Indo-West pacific region, around Japan, The Philippines, and Southeast Africa.
