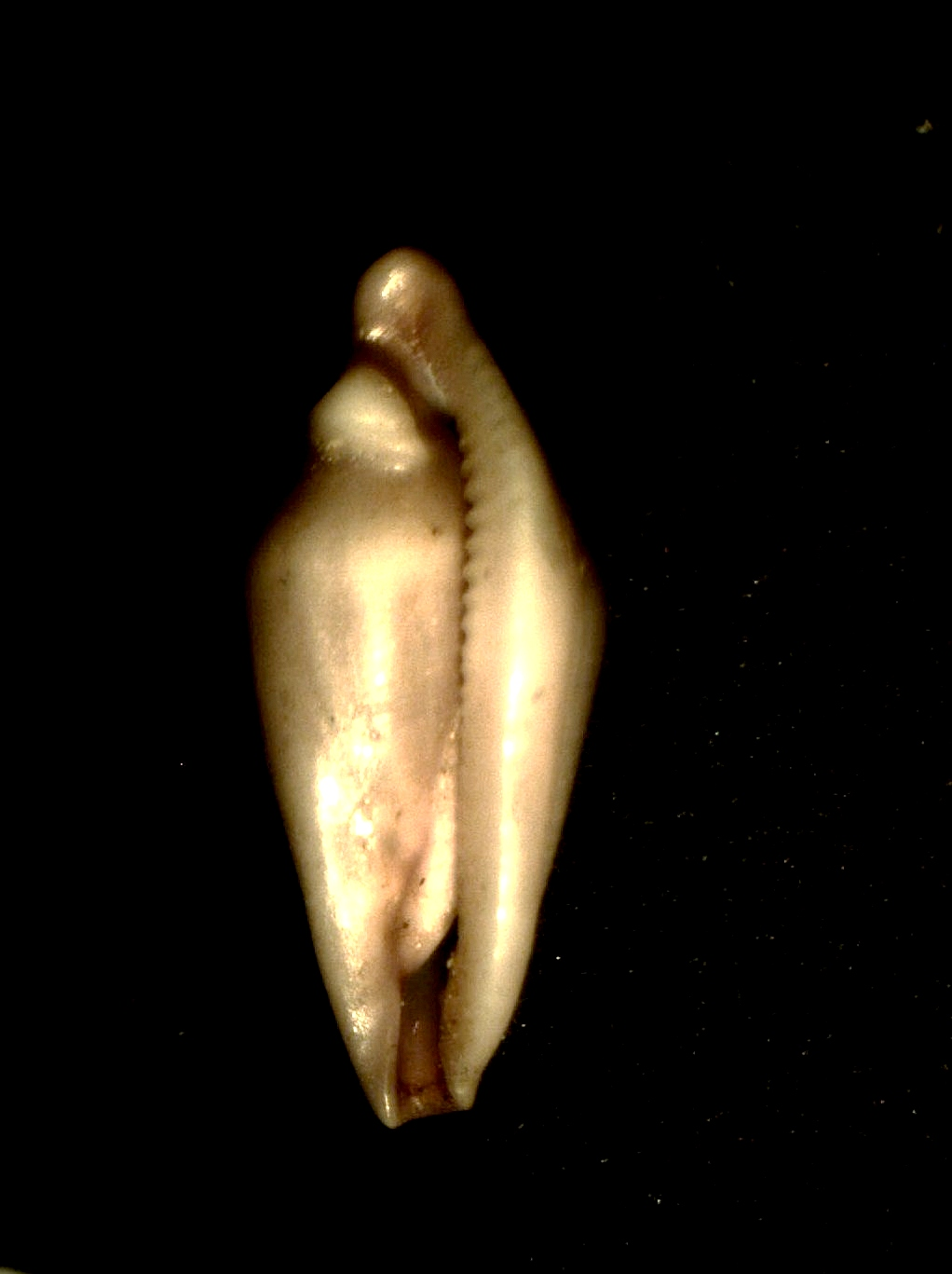
- Apertural view of Cuspivolva allynsmithi

Scientific classification
- Kingdom: Animalia
- Phylum: Mollusca
- Class: Gastropoda
- Subclass: Caenogastropoda
- Order: Littorinimorpha
- Superfamily: Cypraeoidea
- Family: Ovulidae
- Genus: Cuspivolva; Cate, 1973

Type species
- Crenavolva cuspis Cate, 1973

Synonyms
- Delonovolva Cate, 1973; Stohleroma Cate, 1973

= Cuspivolva =

Genus of gastropods

Cuspivolva is a genus of sea snails, marine gastropod mollusks in the subfamily Eocypraeninae of the family Ovulidae.

== Species ==
Species within the genus Cuspivolva include:

- Cuspivolva allynsmithi (Cate, 1978)
- Cuspivolva bellica (Cate, 1973)
- Cuspivolva celzardi (Fehse, 2008)
- Cuspivolva cuspis (Cate, 1973)
- Cuspivolva draperi Cate & Azuma in Cate, 1973
- Cuspivolva habui (Cate, 1973)
- Cuspivolva helenae (Cate, 1973)
- Cuspivolva mucronata (Azuma & Cate, 1971)
- Cuspivolva ostheimerae (Cate, 1973)
- Cuspivolva paulwatsoni Fehse & Lorenz, 2013
- Cuspivolva platysia (Cate, 1973)
- Cuspivolva pulcherrima Fehse, 2019
- Cuspivolva queenslandica (Cate, 1974)
- Cuspivolva singaporica Fehse & Koh, 2016
- Cuspivolva singularis (Cate, 1973)
- Cuspivolva tigris (Yamamoto, 1971)

Species inquirenda

- Cuspivolva narinosa (Cate, 1973)

Species brought into synonymy

- Cuspivolva formosa (Sowerby II in A. Adams & Reeve, 1848): synonym of Primovula formosa (G. B. Sowerby II in Adams & Reeve, 1848)
