= Primovula panthera =

Scientific classification
- Kingdom: Animalia
- Phylum: Mollusca
- Class: Gastropoda
- Subclass: Caenogastropoda
- Order: Littorinimorpha
- Family: Ovulidae
- Genus: Primovula
- Species: P. panthera

Binomial name
- Primovula panthera Omi, 2008

Species of gastropod

Primovula panthera is a species of sea snail, a marine gastropod mollusk in the family Ovulidae, the ovulids, cowry allies or false cowries.
