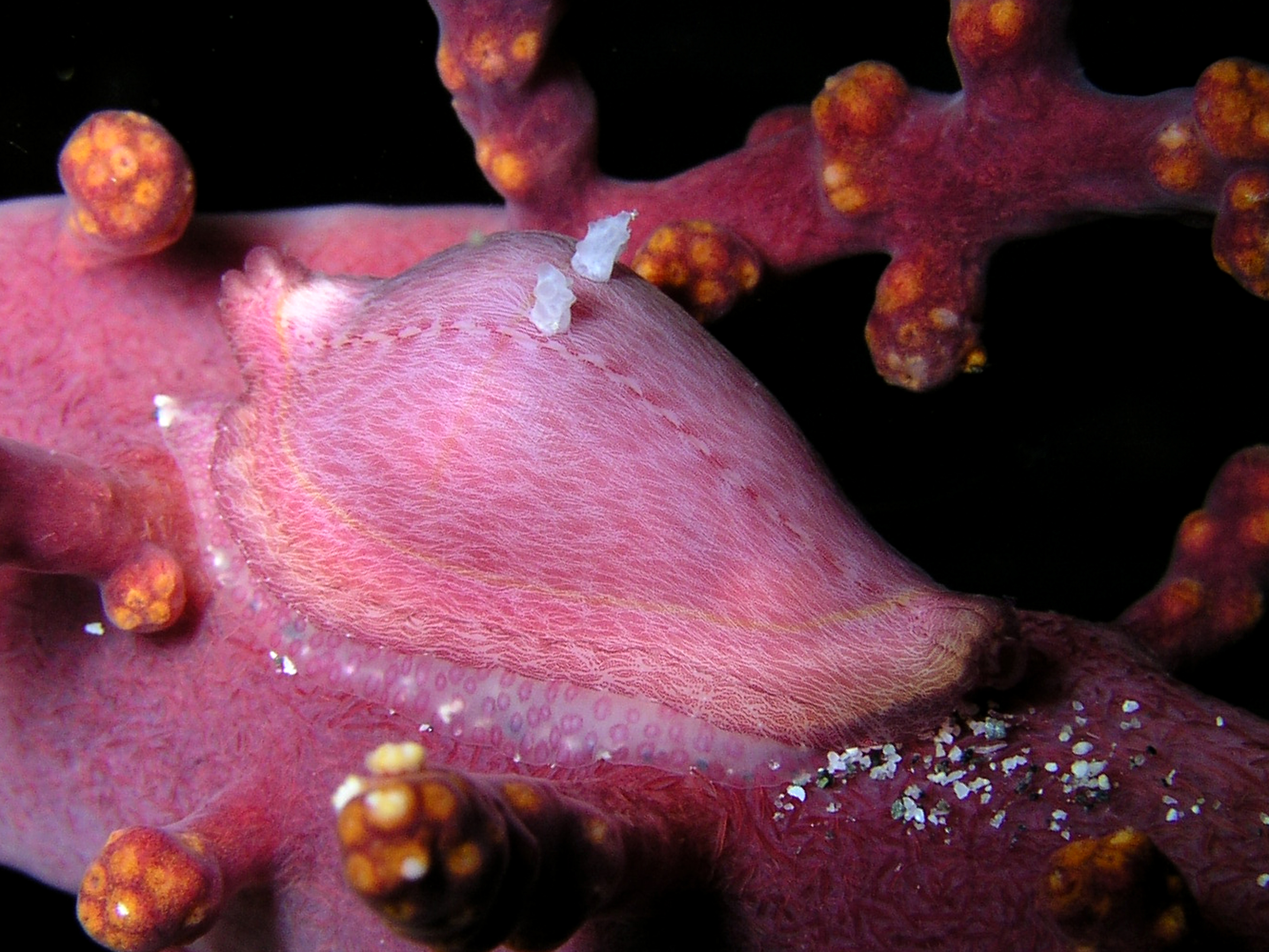
- A live individual of Dentiovula dorsuosa, in situ on its prey species, in Metinaro, East Timor.

Scientific classification
- Kingdom: Animalia
- Phylum: Mollusca
- Class: Gastropoda
- Subclass: Caenogastropoda
- Order: Littorinimorpha
- Family: Ovulidae
- Genus: Dentiovula
- Species: D. dorsuosa

Binomial name
- Dentiovula dorsuosa (Hinds, 1844)

Synonyms
- Ovulum dorsuosum Hinds, 1844

= Dentiovula dorsuosa =

Species of gastropod

Dentiovula dorsuosa is a species of sea snail in the family Ovulidae, the ovulids, cowry allies or false cowries.
