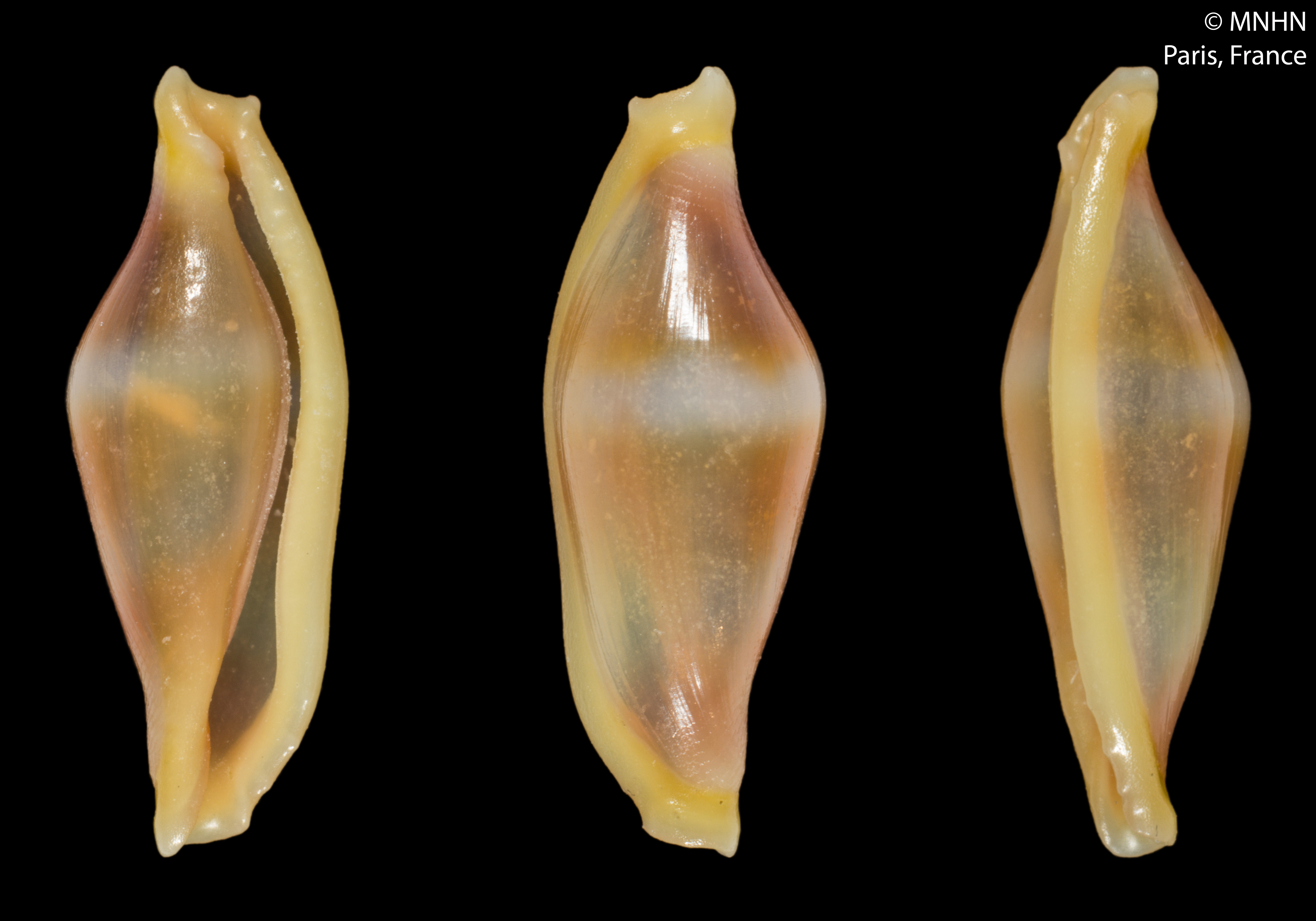
- Shell of Crenavolva philippei (holotype at MNHN, Paris)

Scientific classification
- Kingdom: Animalia
- Phylum: Mollusca
- Class: Gastropoda
- Subclass: Caenogastropoda
- Order: Littorinimorpha
- Family: Ovulidae
- Genus: Crenavolva
- Species: C. philippei

Binomial name
- Crenavolva philippei Lorenz & Fehse, 2009

= Crenavolva philippei =

Species of gastropod

Crenavolva philippei is a species of sea snail, a marine gastropod mollusc in the family Ovulidae, the ovulids, cowry allies or false cowries.

== Description ==
The length of the shell attains 8.2 mm.

== Distribution ==
This species occurs in the Indian Ocean off Réunion, the type locality. It has also been recorded from the Pacific Ocean at Kwajalein Atoll in the Marshall Islands, where it is known from two empty shells collected from the seaward slope; one of these is a paratype of the species.
