= Primovula beckeri =

Scientific classification
- Kingdom: Animalia
- Phylum: Mollusca
- Class: Gastropoda
- Subclass: Caenogastropoda
- Order: Littorinimorpha
- Family: Ovulidae
- Genus: Primovula
- Species: P. beckeri

Binomial name
- Primovula beckeri (Sowerby III, 1900)

Synonyms
- Amphiperas beckeri Sowerby III, 1900

Species of gastropod

Primovula beckeri is a species of sea snail, a marine gastropod mollusk in the family Ovulidae, the ovulids, cowry allies or false cowries.
