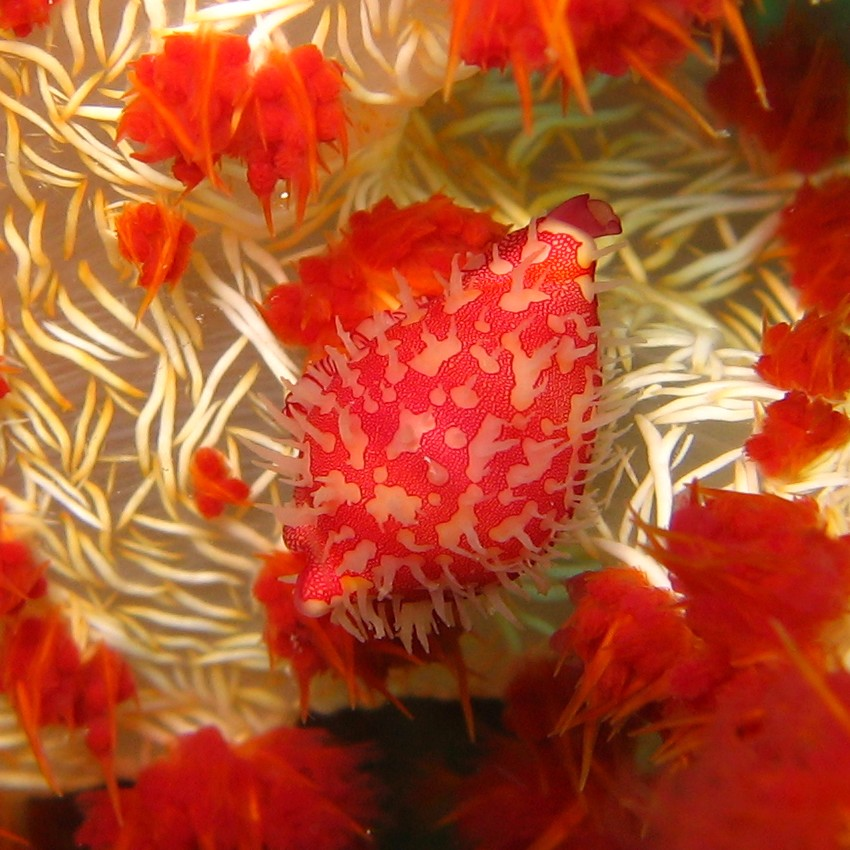
- A live individual of Primovula roseomaculata in situ, head end towards the upper right

Scientific classification
- Kingdom: Animalia
- Phylum: Mollusca
- Class: Gastropoda
- Subclass: Caenogastropoda
- Order: Littorinimorpha
- Family: Ovulidae
- Genus: Primovula
- Species: P. roseomaculata

Binomial name
- Primovula roseomaculata (Schepman, 1909)

Synonyms
- Amphiperas rosemaculata Schepman, 1909; Primovula kurodai Cate & Azuma in Cate, 1973; Primovula roseomaculata florida (Kuroda, 1958); Primovula roseomaculata roseomaculata (Schepman, 1909); Primovula sinomaris Cate, 1973; Pseudosimnia florida Kuroda, 1958

= Primovula roseomaculata =

Species of gastropod

Primovula roseomaculata is a species of sea snail, a marine gastropod mollusk in the family Ovulidae, the ovulids, cowry allies or false cowries.

As is the case in most ovulids, in life, the mantle completely covers the shell almost all of the time.
