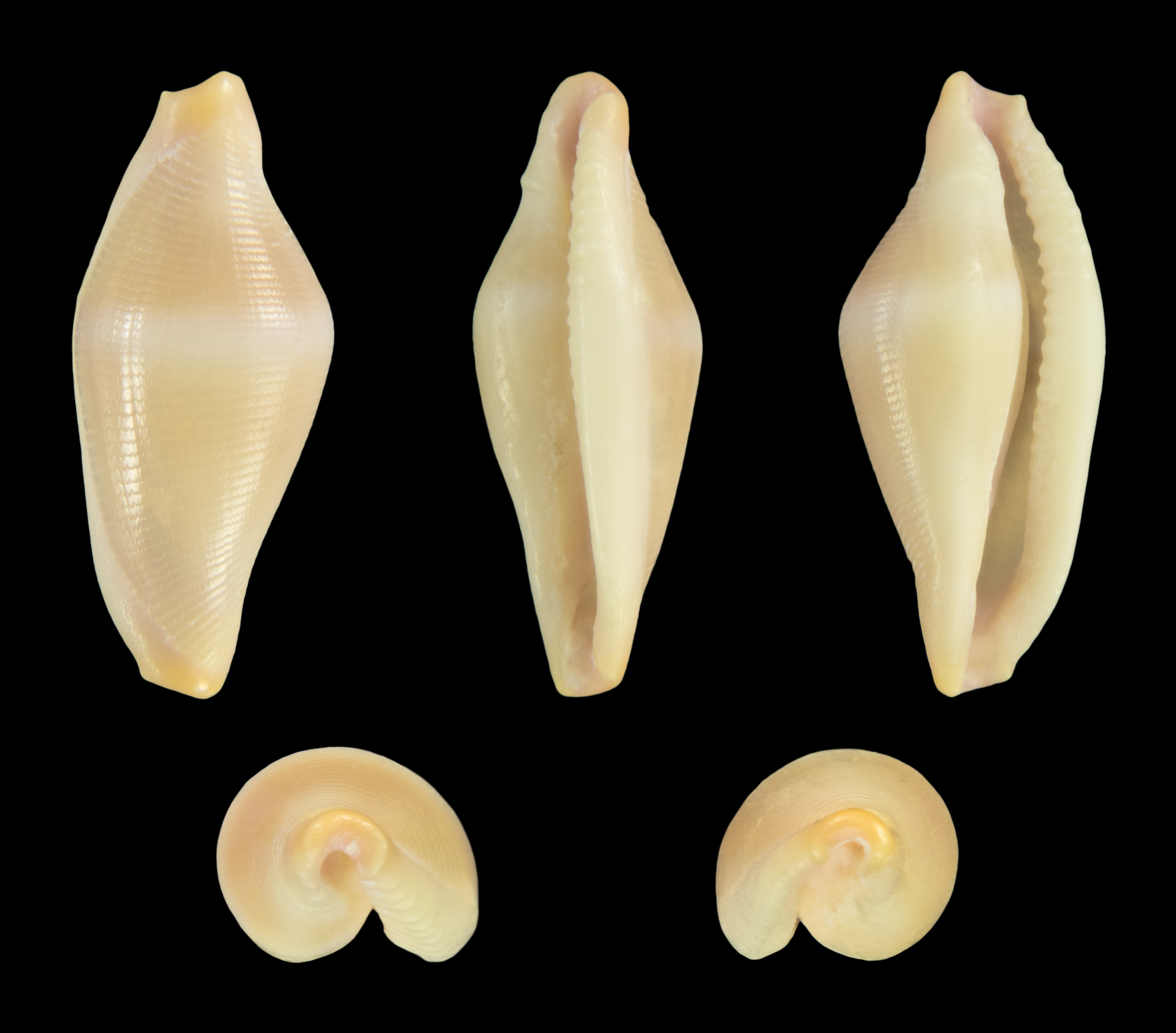

Scientific classification
- Kingdom: Animalia
- Phylum: Mollusca
- Class: Gastropoda
- Subclass: Caenogastropoda
- Order: Littorinimorpha
- Family: Ovulidae
- Genus: Crenavolva
- Species: C. traillii

Binomial name
- Crenavolva traillii (A. Adams, 1855)

Synonyms
- Amphiperas traillii (A. Adams, 1855); Crenavolva striatula trailli (A. Adams, 1855); Crenavolva traillii hesperia Cate, 1973; Ovula dentata Angas, 1887; Primovula formosa Schilder, 1941

= Crenavolva traillii =

Traill's ovulid

Species of gastropod

Crenavolva traillii, common name Traill's ovulid, is a species of sea snail, a marine gastropod mollusk in the family 'Ovulidae', 'the ovulids', 'cowry allies' or 'false cowries'.

== Description ==
The size of the shell varies between 5 mm and 15 mm.

Their functional group is benthos.

Their feeding type is predatory, specifically on sessile prey.

== Distribution ==
This marine species occurs off Japan, in the Indo-Pacific and off Australia (Queensland).
