= Crenavolva marmorata =

Scientific classification
- Kingdom: Animalia
- Phylum: Mollusca
- Class: Gastropoda
- Subclass: Caenogastropoda
- Order: Littorinimorpha
- Family: Ovulidae
- Genus: Crenavolva
- Species: C. marmorata

Binomial name
- Crenavolva marmorata Fehse, 2007

Species of gastropod

Crenavolva marmorata is a species of sea snail, a marine gastropod mollusk in the family Ovulidae, the ovulids, cowry allies or false cowries.
