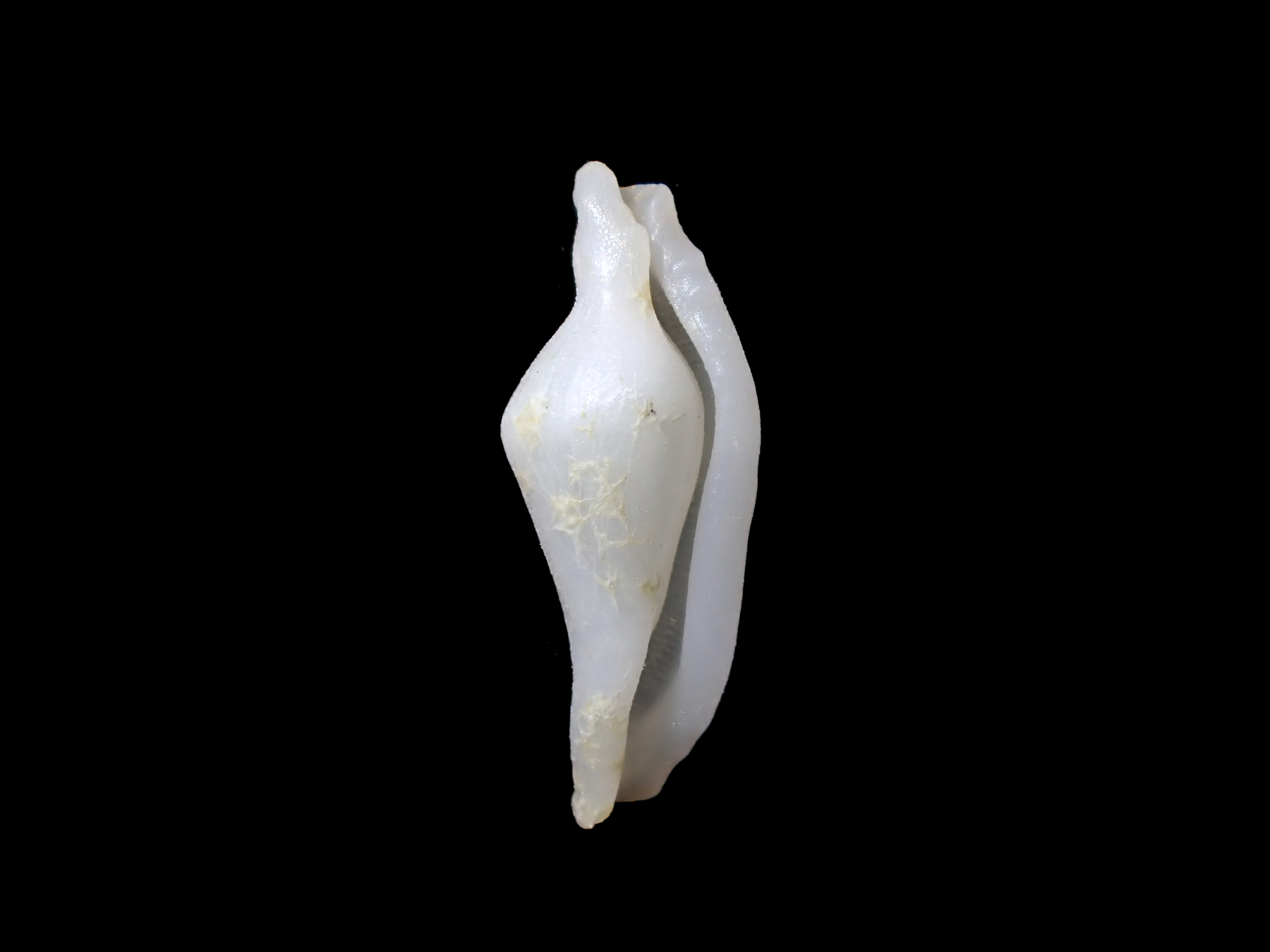

Scientific classification
- Kingdom: Animalia
- Phylum: Mollusca
- Class: Gastropoda
- Subclass: Caenogastropoda
- Order: Littorinimorpha
- Family: Ovulidae
- Genus: Crenavolva
- Species: C. tokuoi

Binomial name
- Crenavolva tokuoi Azuma, 1989

= Crenavolva tokuoi =

Species of gastropod

Crenavolva tokuoi is a species of sea snail, a marine gastropod mollusk in the family Ovulidae, the ovulids, cowry allies or false cowries.
