= Maria Schilder =

German malacologist and chemist

- Born: Maria Hertrich; 4 August 1898; Germany
- Died: 30 July 1975 (aged 76)
- Citizenship: Germany
- Known for: 250 scientific papers, most on the living and fossil Cypraeidae
- Spouse: Franz Alfred Schilder
- Scientific career
- Fields: chemistry, malacology

Maria Schilder, née Hertrich (4 August 1898 – 30 July 1975) was a German malacologist and chemist. Along with her husband, Franz Alfred Schilder, she systematized molluscs having produced over 250 scientific papers, most on the living and fossil Cypraeidae, or cowries.

== Life ==
Maria Hertrich was born on 4 August 1898. She was from Munich. Around 1922 she married Franz Alfred Schilder. They had one daughter Franzisca who died in 1961.

Maria Schilder died 30 July 1975.

== Work ==
Being initially a chemist, Schilder switched her professional focus to the study of molluscs. Together with her husband, Franz Alfred, Schilder studied the family Cypraeidae, the cowries. The Schilders defined areas of endemism throughout the Indo-West Pacific based on mollusk distributions. Along with her husband, Schilder identified geographically distinct races (or subspecies) and recognized them taxonomically.

In “Revision of the Genus Monetaria (Cypraeidae)” they researched how Bergmann's Rule applied to east coastal Australia where the shells are smaller in the warmer north. Together the Schilders wrote over 250 scientific papers, most on the living and fossil Cypraeidae, or cowries.

After the death of her husband, Schilder published A Catalog of Living and Fossil Cowries in 1971.

Schilder is honored in the cowry name Annepona mariae (Schilder, 1927) and her daughter Franzisca is honored in the cowry name Bistolida hirundo francisca (Schilder & Schilder, 1938).

== Publications (selection) ==
- 1930 – Variationsstatistische studien an Monetaria annulus (Moll. Gastr. Cypraeidae)
- 1938 – Prodrome of a monograph on living Cypraeidae
- 1949 – Beiträge zur taxonomischen Zoologie
- 1952 – Die Kaurischnecke
- 1954 – Zahl und Verbreitung der Käfer
- 1971 – A catalogue of living and fossil cowries. Taxonomy and bibliography of Triviacea and Cypraeacea
