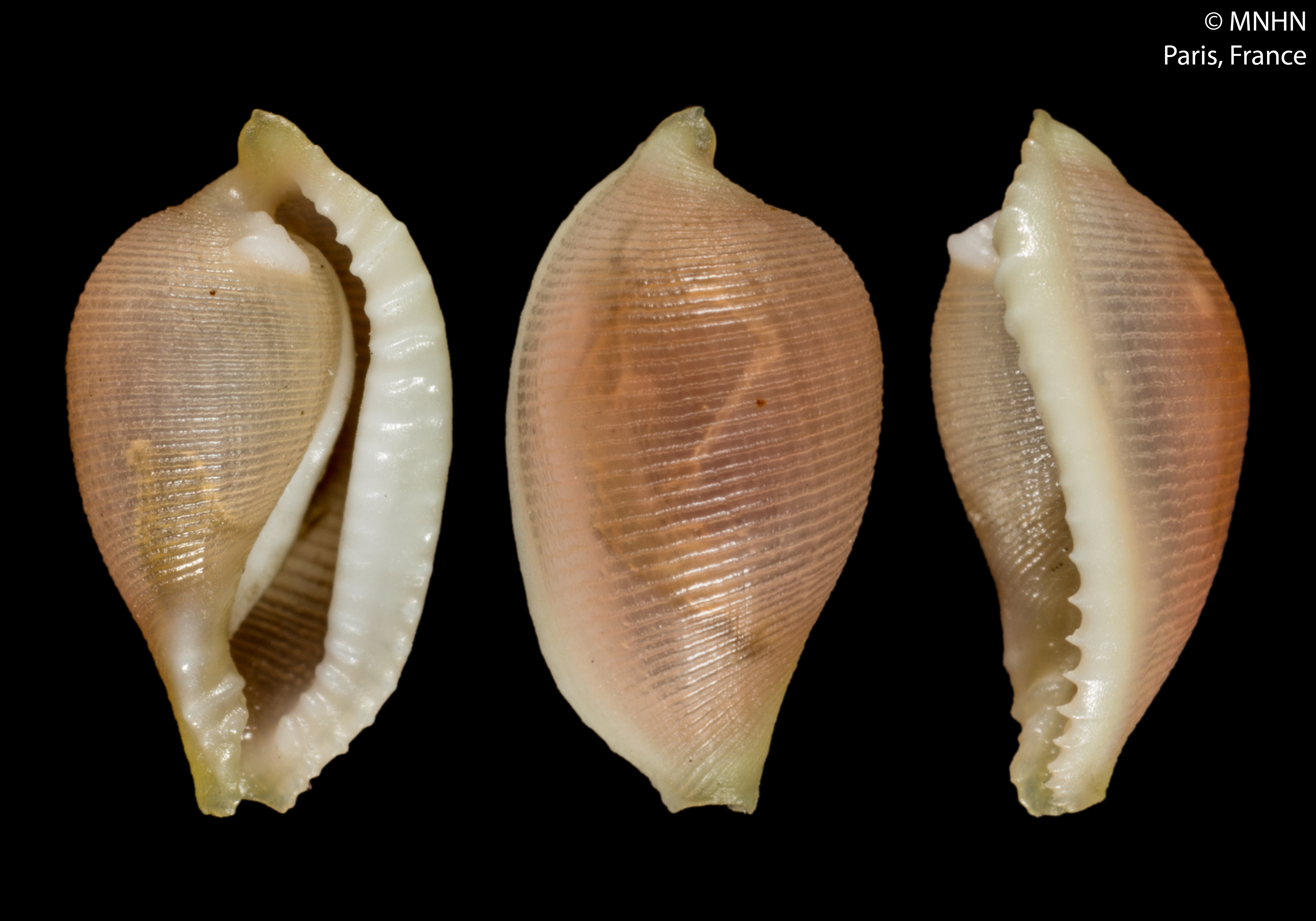
- Shell of Serratovolva luteocincta

Scientific classification
- Kingdom: Animalia
- Phylum: Mollusca
- Class: Gastropoda
- Subclass: Caenogastropoda
- Order: Littorinimorpha
- Superfamily: Cypraeoidea
- Family: Ovulidae
- Genus: Serratovolva; Cate, 1973

= Serratovolva =

Genus of gastropods

Serratovolva is a genus of sea snails, marine gastropod mollusks in the subfamily Eocypraeinae of the family Ovulidae.

== Species ==
Species within the genus Serratovolva include:

- Serratovolva dondani (Cate, 1964)
- Serratovolva luteocincta Celzard, 2008
- Serratovolva minabeensis Cate, 1975
