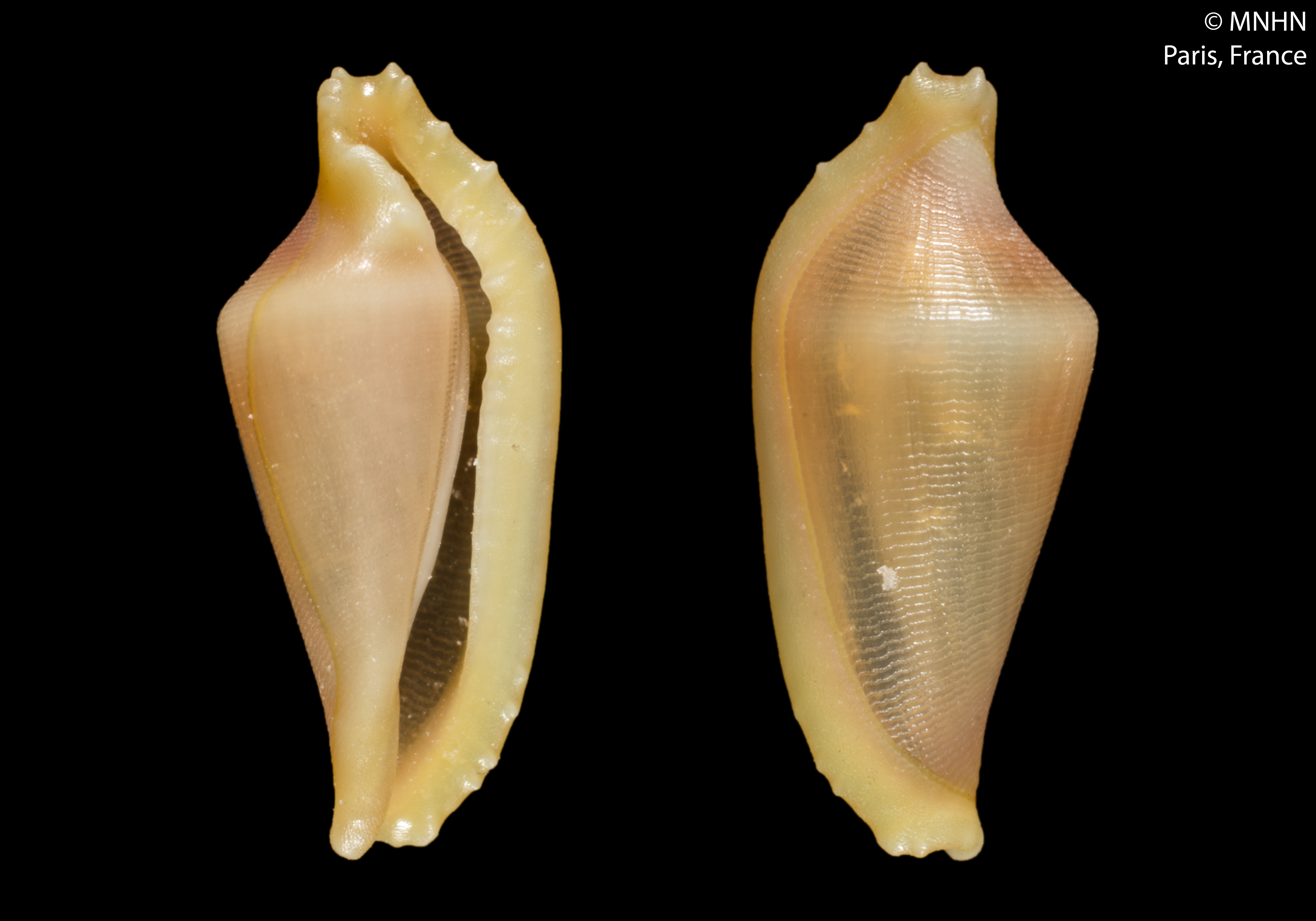

Scientific classification
- Kingdom: Animalia
- Phylum: Mollusca
- Class: Gastropoda
- Subclass: Caenogastropoda
- Order: Littorinimorpha
- Family: Ovulidae
- Genus: Dentiovula
- Species: D. deforgesi

Binomial name
- Dentiovula deforgesi Lorenz & Fehse, 2009

= Dentiovula deforgesi =

Species of gastropod

Dentiovula deforgesi is a species of sea snail in the family Ovulidae, the ovulids, cowry allies or false cowries.
