= Dentiovula eizoi =

Scientific classification
- Kingdom: Animalia
- Phylum: Mollusca
- Class: Gastropoda
- Subclass: Caenogastropoda
- Order: Littorinimorpha
- Family: Ovulidae
- Genus: Dentiovula
- Species: D. eizoi

Binomial name
- Dentiovula eizoi Cate & Azuma in Cate, 1973

Synonyms
- Dentiovula cobra Cate, 1975; Dentiovula spectabilis Cate, 1975

Species of gastropod

Dentiovula eizoi is a species of sea snail in the family Ovulidae, the ovulids, cowry allies or false cowries.
