= Crenavolva matsumiyai =

Scientific classification
- Kingdom: Animalia
- Phylum: Mollusca
- Class: Gastropoda
- Subclass: Caenogastropoda
- Order: Littorinimorpha
- Family: Ovulidae
- Genus: Crenavolva
- Species: C. matsumiyai

Binomial name
- Crenavolva matsumiyai Azuma, 1974

Species of gastropod

Crenavolva matsumiyai is a species of sea snail, a marine gastropod mollusk in the family Ovulidae, the ovulids, cowry allies or false cowries.
