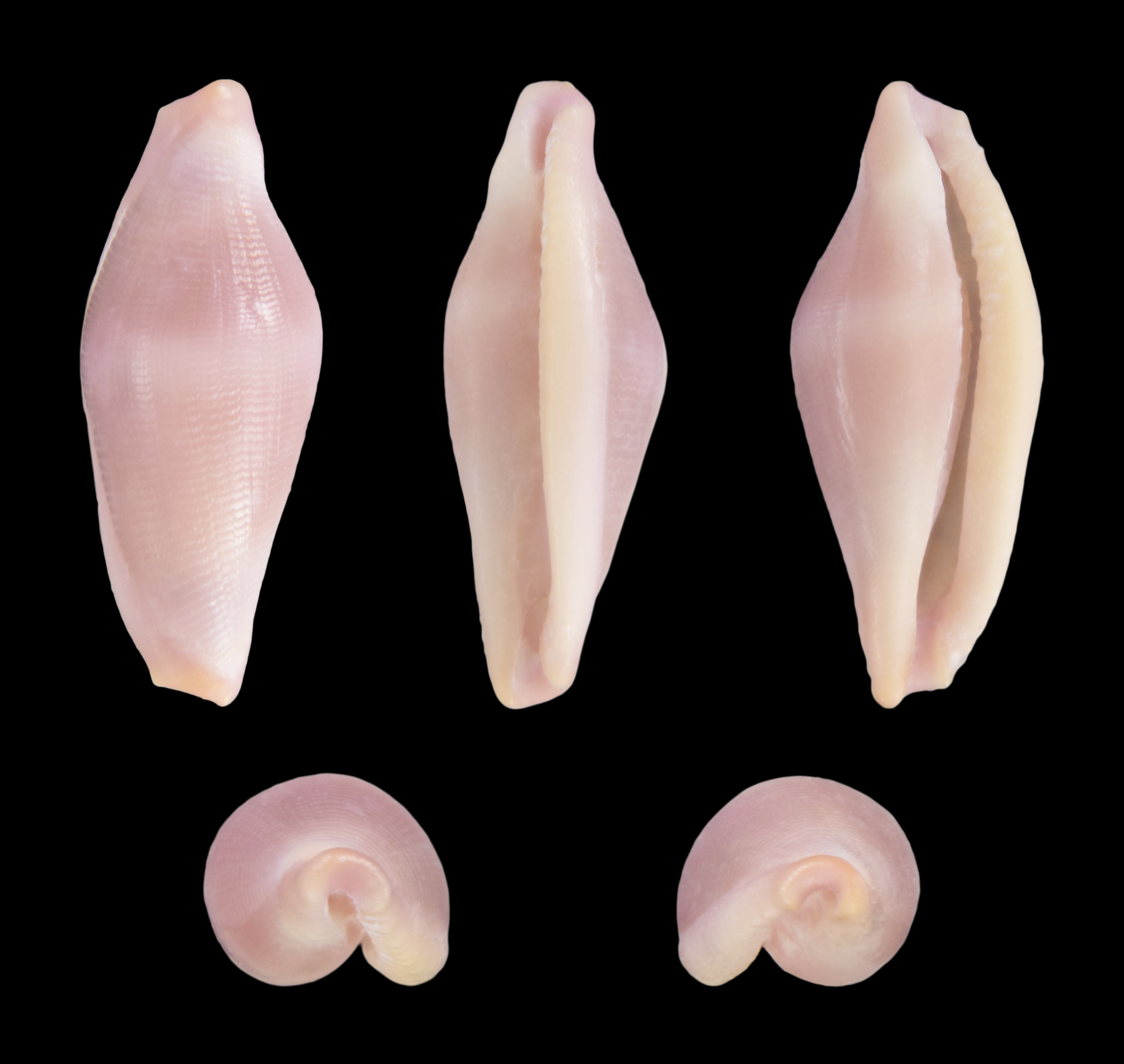

Scientific classification
- Kingdom: Animalia
- Phylum: Mollusca
- Class: Gastropoda
- Subclass: Caenogastropoda
- Order: Littorinimorpha
- Family: Ovulidae
- Genus: Crenavolva
- Species: C. tinctura

Binomial name
- Crenavolva tinctura (Garrard, 1963)

Synonyms
- Crenavolva striatula tinctura (Garrard, 1963); Neosimnia tinctura Garrard, 1963

= Crenavolva tinctura =

Species of gastropod

Crenavolva tinctura is a species of sea snail, a marine gastropod mollusk in the family Ovulidae, the ovulids, cowry allies or false cowries.
