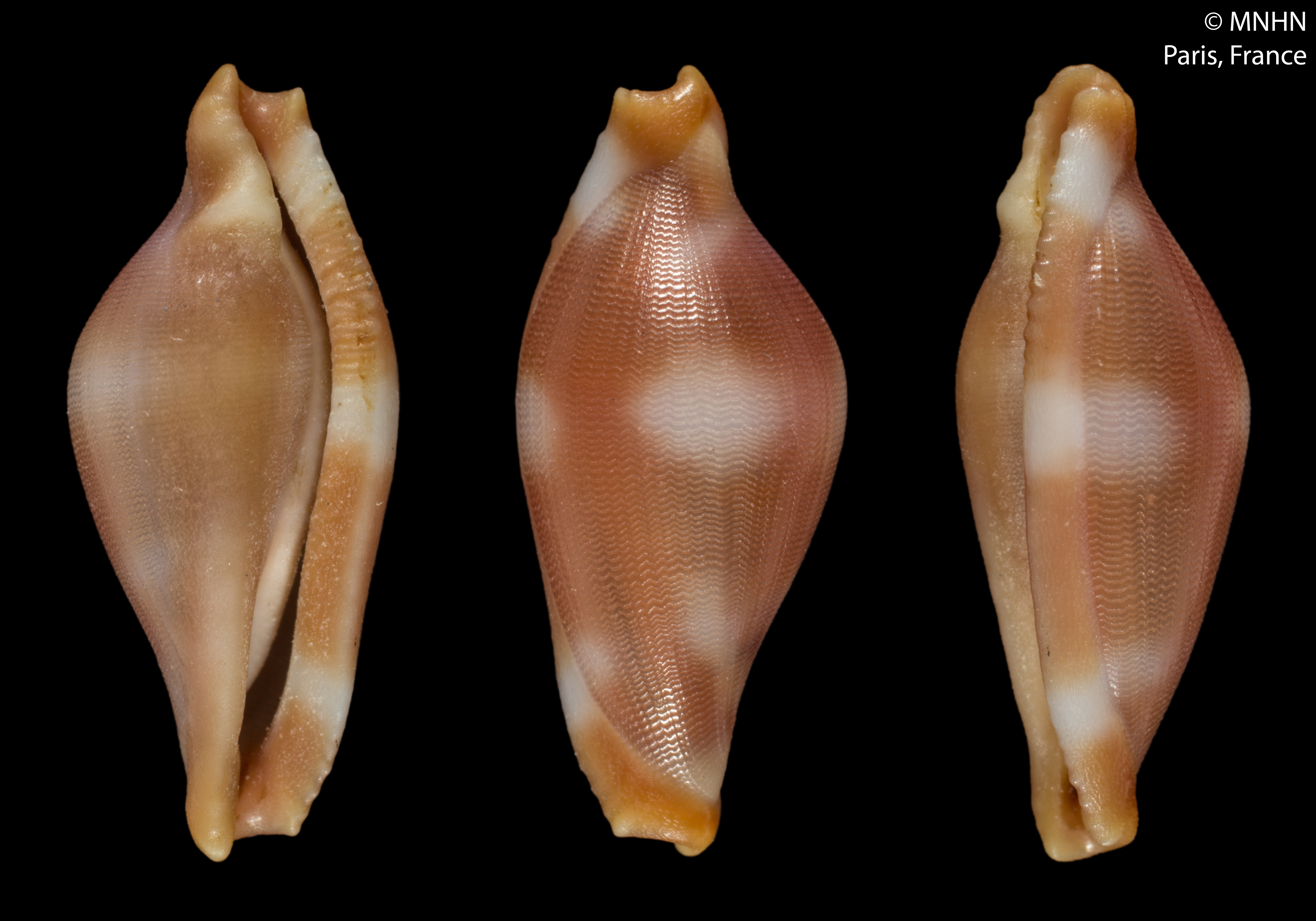
- Shell of Crenavolva janae (holotype at MNHN, Paris)

Scientific classification
- Kingdom: Animalia
- Phylum: Mollusca
- Class: Gastropoda
- Subclass: Caenogastropoda
- Order: Littorinimorpha
- Family: Ovulidae
- Genus: Crenavolva
- Species: C. janae

Binomial name
- Crenavolva janae Lorenz & Fehse, 2009

= Crenavolva janae =

Species of gastropod

Crenavolva janae is a species of sea snail, a marine gastropod mollusc in the family Ovulidae, the ovulids, cowry allies or false cowries.

== Description ==
The length of the shell attains 9.6 mm.

== Distribution ==
This marine species occurs off Northwest Australia.
