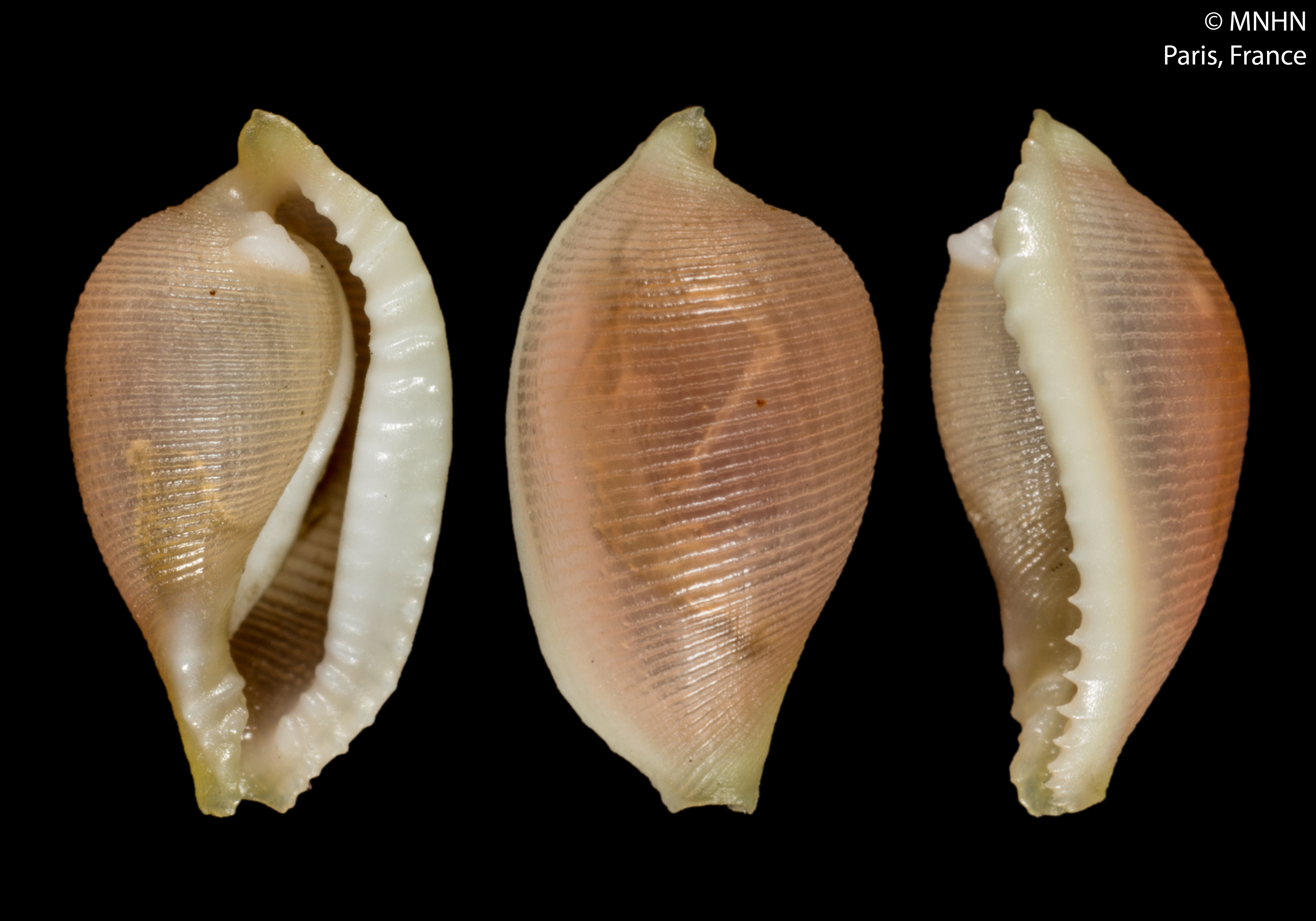
- Shell of Serratovolva luteocincta (holotype at MNHN, Paris)

Scientific classification
- Kingdom: Animalia
- Phylum: Mollusca
- Class: Gastropoda
- Subclass: Caenogastropoda
- Order: Littorinimorpha
- Family: Ovulidae
- Genus: Serratovolva
- Species: S. luteocincta

Binomial name
- Serratovolva luteocincta Celzard, 2008

= Serratovolva luteocincta =

Species of gastropod

Serratovolva luteocincta is a species of sea snail, a marine gastropod mollusk in the family Ovulidae, the ovulids, cowry allies or false cowries. It is one of the species in the genus Serratovolva, which includes at least one other recognized species, a group known for their smooth, elongated shells.

== Description ==
The shell reaches 6.4 mm in length in the holotype, although paratypes up to 8.8 mm long have been reported. The shell is small, slightly translucent, lightweight but solid, and has a notably inflated pyriform shape. Its dorsum is pale flesh-colored to orangish pink and bears deep transverse striations that extend onto the base. The base is strongly convex and slightly paler than the dorsum. The anterior ridge and posterior portion of the outer lip are strongly crenulated, and the species is distinguished from other members of the genus by the arrangement of its denticles and teeth.

== Distribution ==
This species occurs in the China Seas at a depth of 180 m.
