= Primovula rosewateri =

Scientific classification
- Kingdom: Animalia
- Phylum: Mollusca
- Class: Gastropoda
- Subclass: Caenogastropoda
- Order: Littorinimorpha
- Family: Ovulidae
- Genus: Primovula
- Species: P. rosewateri

Binomial name
- Primovula rosewateri (Cate, 1973)

Synonyms
- Crenavolva rosewateri Cate, 1973; Pseudosimnia filia Azuma, 1974

Species of gastropod

Primovula rosewateri is a species of sea snail, a marine gastropod mollusk in the family Ovulidae, the ovulids, cowry allies or false cowries.

== Description ==
Primovula rosewateri has a white to purple shell with reddish-orangish extremities.
