= Cuspivolva platysia =

Scientific classification
- Kingdom: Animalia
- Phylum: Mollusca
- Class: Gastropoda
- Subclass: Caenogastropoda
- Order: Littorinimorpha
- Family: Ovulidae
- Genus: Cuspivolva
- Species: C. platysia

Binomial name
- Cuspivolva platysia (Cate, 1973)

Synonyms
- Ovula formosa Verco, 1935; Primovula platysia Cate, 1973

Species of gastropod

Cuspivolva platysia is a species of sea snail in the family Ovulidae, the ovulids, cowry allies or false cowries.
