= Pseudosimnia vanhyningi =

Scientific classification
- Kingdom: Animalia
- Phylum: Mollusca
- Class: Gastropoda
- Subclass: Caenogastropoda
- Order: Littorinimorpha
- Family: Ovulidae
- Genus: Pseudosimnia
- Species: P. vanhyningi

Binomial name
- Pseudosimnia vanhyningi (M. Smith, 1940)

Synonyms
- Primovula solemi Cate, 1973; Primovula vanhyningi M. Smith, 1940; Pseudosimnia pyrifera Cate, 1973; Pseudosimnia sphoni Cate, 1973

Species of gastropod

Pseudosimnia vanhyningi is a species of sea snail, a marine gastropod mollusk in the family Ovulidae, the ovulids, cowry allies or false cowries.

== Description ==
The maximum recorded shell length is 15.4 mm.

== Habitat ==
Minimum recorded depth is 46 m. Maximum recorded depth is 183 m.
