= Cuspivolva cuspis =

Scientific classification
- Kingdom: Animalia
- Phylum: Mollusca
- Class: Gastropoda
- Subclass: Caenogastropoda
- Order: Littorinimorpha
- Family: Ovulidae
- Genus: Cuspivolva
- Species: C. cuspis

Binomial name
- Cuspivolva cuspis (Cate, 1973)

Synonyms
- Crenavolva cuspis Cate, 1973

Species of gastropod

Cuspivolva cuspis is a species of sea snail in the family Ovulidae, the ovulids, cowry allies or false cowries.

== Description ==
They have a shaft-like body, propelled by two spheres at one end that stick to the ground so that it may inch along. Its head resembles the top of a mushroom, but is pink with a small hole at the top through which to eat.
