= Dentiovula oryza =

Scientific classification
- Kingdom: Animalia
- Phylum: Mollusca
- Class: Gastropoda
- Subclass: Caenogastropoda
- Order: Littorinimorpha
- Family: Ovulidae
- Genus: Dentiovula
- Species: D. oryza

Binomial name
- Dentiovula oryza (Omi & Clover, 2005)

Synonyms
- Primovula oryza Omi & Clover, 2005

Species of gastropod

Dentiovula oryza is a species of sea snail in the family Ovulidae, the ovulids, cowry allies or false cowries.
