= Dentiovula colobica =

Scientific classification
- Kingdom: Animalia
- Phylum: Mollusca
- Class: Gastropoda
- Subclass: Caenogastropoda
- Order: Littorinimorpha
- Family: Ovulidae
- Genus: Dentiovula
- Species: D. colobica

Binomial name
- Dentiovula colobica (Azuma & Cate, 1971)

Synonyms
- Dentiovula cardini Cate, 1978; Dentiovula diadema Cate, 1978; Dentiovula saturnalia Cate & Azuma in Cate, 1973; Primovula colobica Azuma & Cate, 1971

Species of gastropod

Dentiovula colobica is a species of sea snail in the family Ovulidae, the ovulids, cowry allies or false cowries.
