= Cuspivolva draperi =

Scientific classification
- Kingdom: Animalia
- Phylum: Mollusca
- Class: Gastropoda
- Subclass: Caenogastropoda
- Order: Littorinimorpha
- Family: Ovulidae
- Genus: Cuspivolva
- Species: C. draperi

Binomial name
- Cuspivolva draperi Cate & Azuma in Cate, 1973

Synonyms
- Crenavolva draperi Cate & Azuma in Cate, 1973

Species of gastropod

Cuspivolva draperi is a species of sea snail in the family Ovulidae, the ovulids, cowry allies or false cowries.
