= Dentiovula horai =

Scientific classification
- Kingdom: Animalia
- Phylum: Mollusca
- Class: Gastropoda
- Subclass: Caenogastropoda
- Order: Littorinimorpha
- Family: Ovulidae
- Genus: Dentiovula
- Species: D. horai

Binomial name
- Dentiovula horai (Cardin, 1994)

Synonyms
- Primovula horai Cardin, 1994

Species of gastropod

Dentiovula horai is a species of sea snail in the family Ovulidae, the ovulids, cowry allies or false cowries.

== Distribution ==
Bohol, Philippines.
