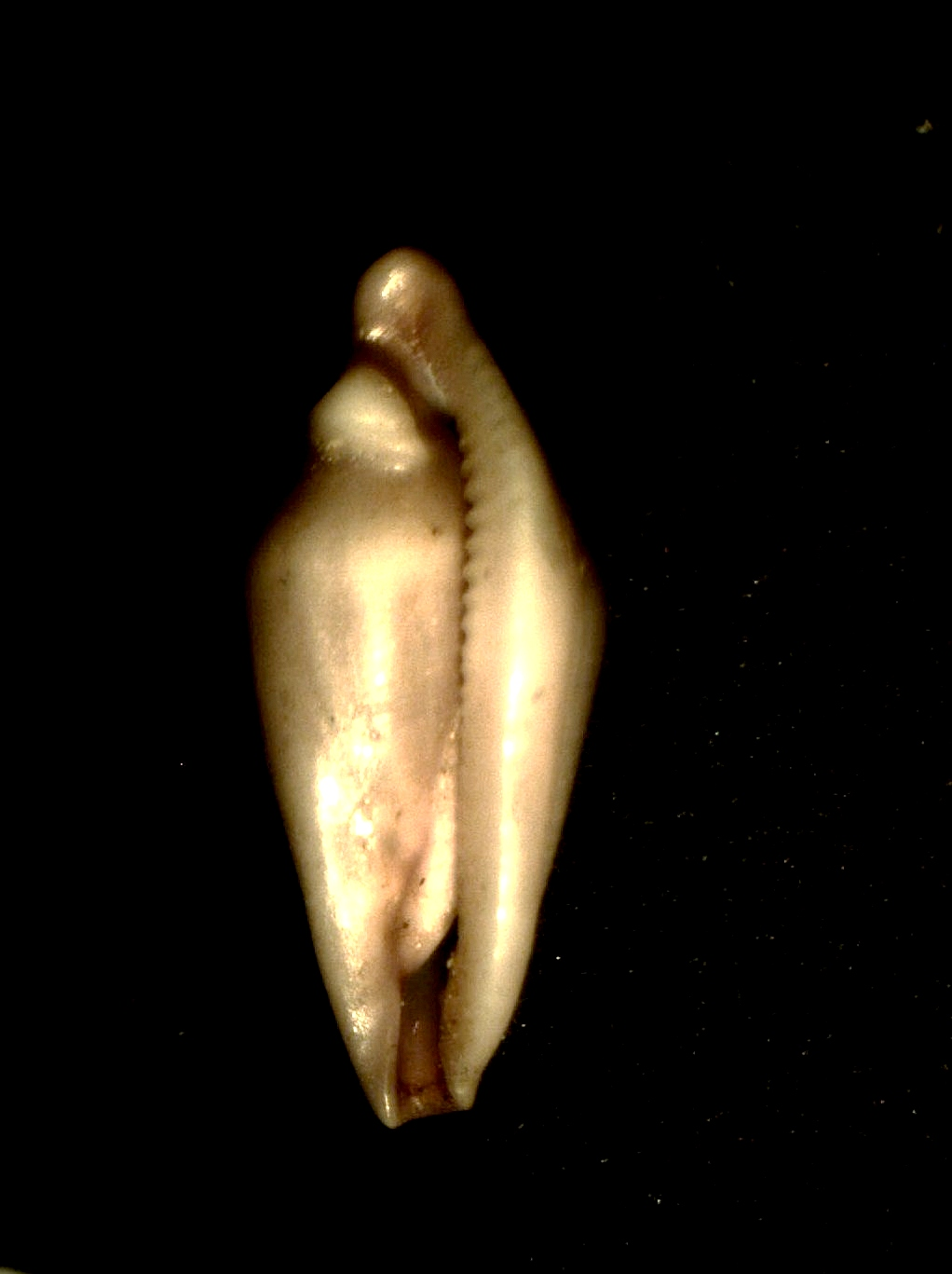
- Apertural view of Cuspivolva allynsmithi

Scientific classification
- Kingdom: Animalia
- Phylum: Mollusca
- Class: Gastropoda
- Subclass: Caenogastropoda
- Order: Littorinimorpha
- Family: Ovulidae
- Genus: Cuspivolva
- Species: C. allynsmithi

Binomial name
- Cuspivolva allynsmithi (Cate, 1978)

Synonyms
- Crenavolva chinensis Qi Zong-Yan & Ma Xiu-Tong, 1983

= Cuspivolva allynsmithi =

Species of gastropod

Cuspivolva allynsmithi is a species of sea snail in the family Ovulidae, the ovulids, cowry allies or false cowries.
