= Crenavolva virgo =

Scientific classification
- Kingdom: Animalia
- Phylum: Mollusca
- Class: Gastropoda
- Subclass: Caenogastropoda
- Order: Littorinimorpha
- Family: Ovulidae
- Genus: Crenavolva
- Species: C. virgo

Binomial name
- Crenavolva virgo (Azuma & Cate, 1971)

Synonyms
- Crenavolva periopsis Cate, 1978; Primovula virgo Azuma & Cate, 1971

Species of gastropod

Crenavolva virgo is a species of sea snail, a marine gastropod mollusk in the family Ovulidae, the ovulids, cowry allies or false cowries.
