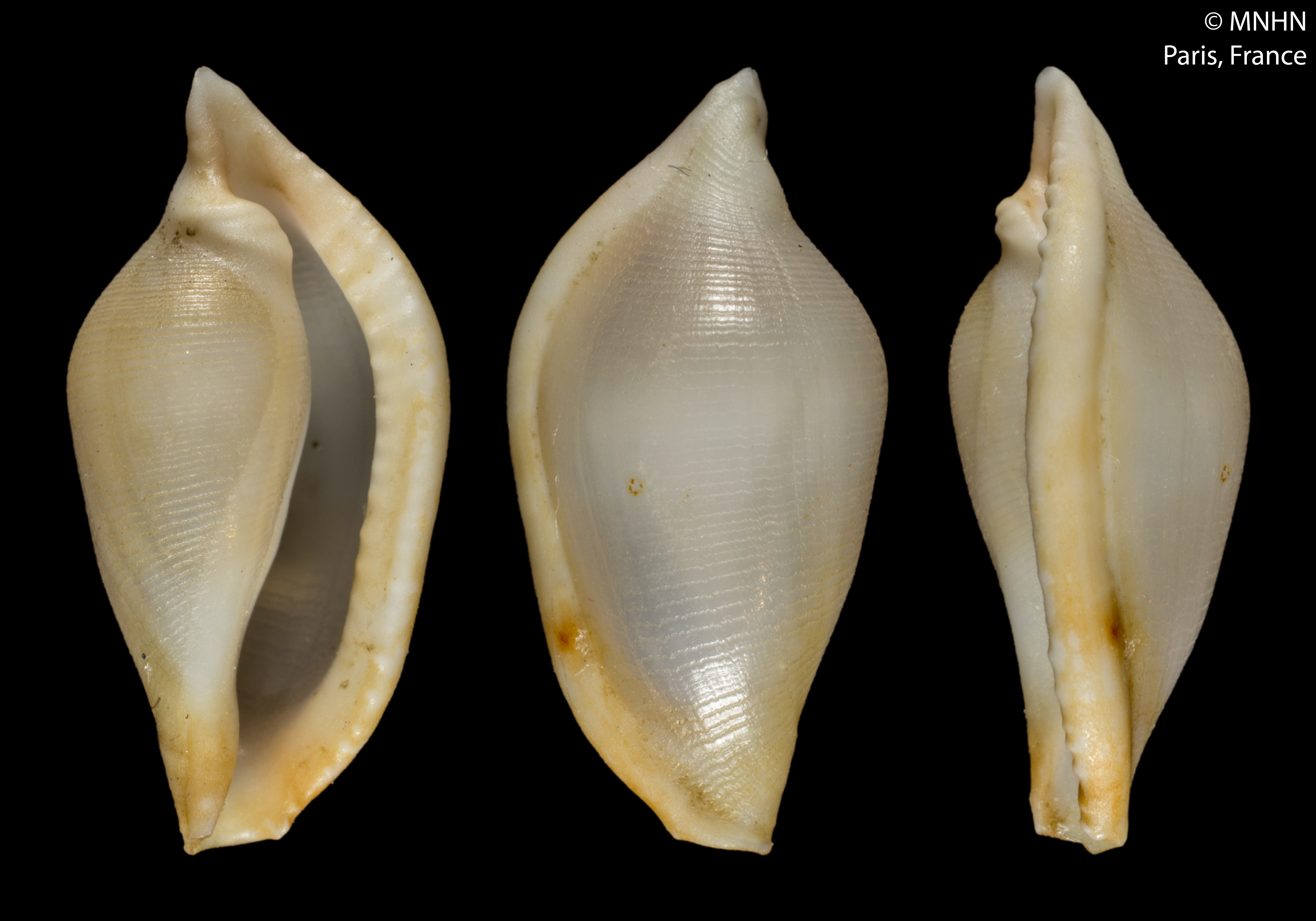
- Shell of Cuspivolva celzardi (holotype at MNHN, Paris)

Scientific classification
- Kingdom: Animalia
- Phylum: Mollusca
- Class: Gastropoda
- Subclass: Caenogastropoda
- Order: Littorinimorpha
- Family: Ovulidae
- Genus: Cuspivolva
- Species: C. celzardi

Binomial name
- Cuspivolva celzardi (Fehse, 2008)

Synonyms
- Primovula celzardi Fehse, 2008

= Cuspivolva celzardi =

Species of gastropod

Cuspivolva celzardi is a species of sea snail, a marine gastropod mollusc in the family Ovulidae, the ovulids, cowry allies or false cowries.

== Description ==
The length of the shell attains 12 mm.

== Distribution ==
This species occurs in the East China Sea.
