= Cuspivolva ostheimerae =

Scientific classification
- Kingdom: Animalia
- Phylum: Mollusca
- Class: Gastropoda
- Subclass: Caenogastropoda
- Order: Littorinimorpha
- Family: Ovulidae
- Genus: Cuspivolva
- Species: C. ostheimerae

Binomial name
- Cuspivolva ostheimerae (Cate, 1973)

Synonyms
- Crenavolva ostheimerae Cate, 1973

Species of gastropod

Cuspivolva ostheimerae is a species of sea snail in the family Ovulidae, the ovulids, cowry allies or false cowries.
