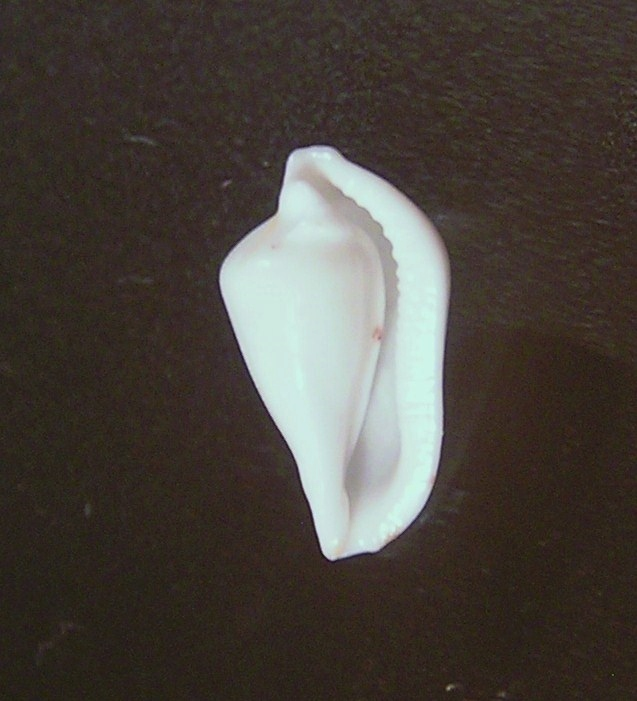

Scientific classification
- Kingdom: Animalia
- Phylum: Mollusca
- Class: Gastropoda
- Subclass: Caenogastropoda
- Order: Littorinimorpha
- Family: Ovulidae
- Genus: Dentiovula
- Species: D. rutherfordiana

Binomial name
- Dentiovula rutherfordiana (Cate, 1973)

Synonyms
- Primovula rutherfordiana Cate, 1973

= Dentiovula rutherfordiana =

Species of gastropod

Dentiovula rutherfordiana is a species of sea snail in the family Ovulidae, the ovulids, cowry allies or false cowries.
