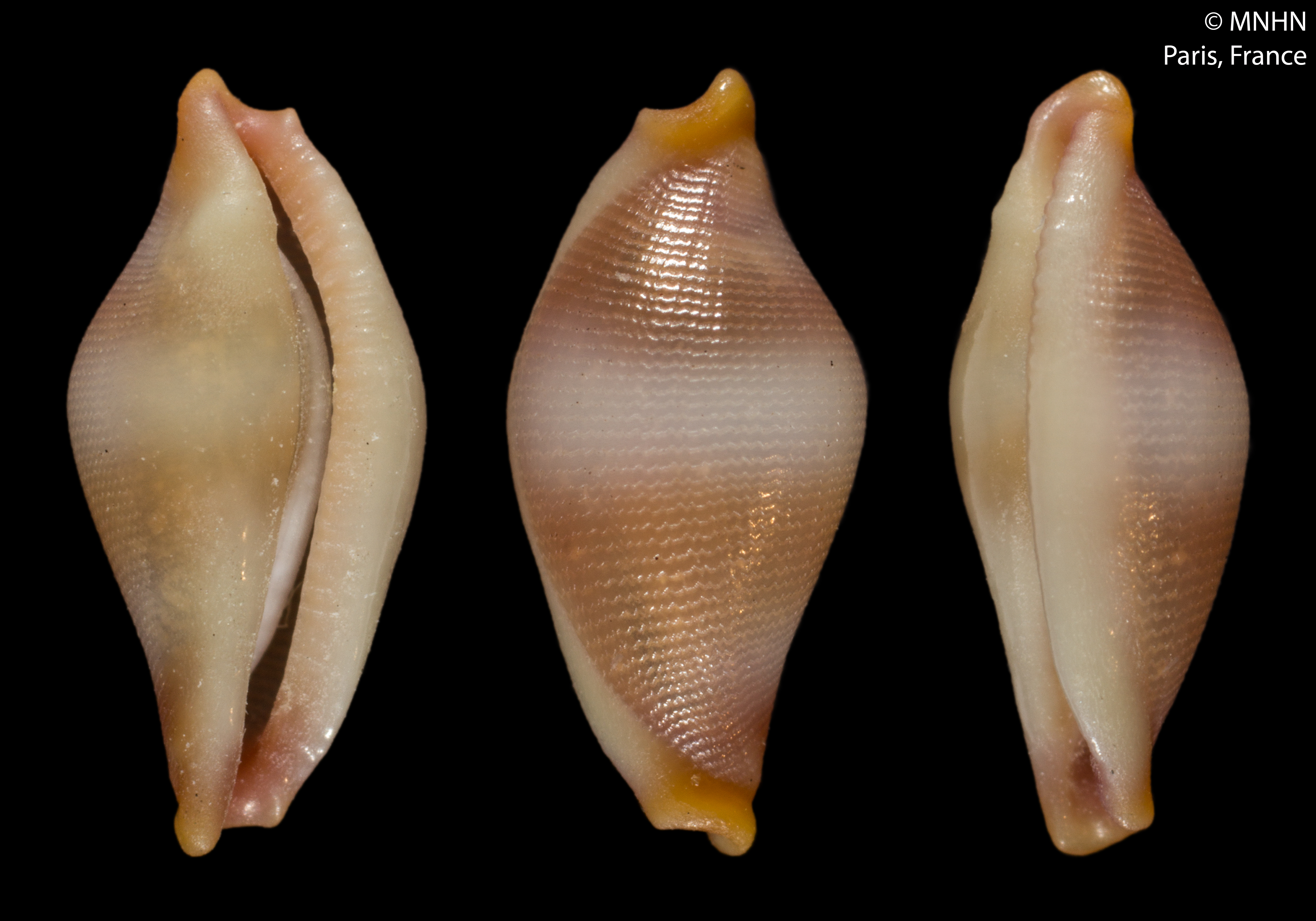
- Shell of Crenavolva aureola (holotype at MNHN, Paris)

Scientific classification
- Kingdom: Animalia
- Phylum: Mollusca
- Class: Gastropoda
- Subclass: Caenogastropoda
- Order: Littorinimorpha
- Family: Ovulidae
- Genus: Crenavolva
- Species: C. aureola

Binomial name
- Crenavolva aureola (Fehse, 2002)

Synonyms
- Crenavolva chiapponii Lorenz & Fehse, 2009; Primovula aureola Fehse, 2002

= Crenavolva aureola =

Species of gastropod

Crenavolva aureola is a species of sea snail, a marine gastropod mollusk in the family Ovulidae, the ovulids, cowry allies or false cowries.

== Description ==
The length of the shell attains 5.9 mm.

== Distribution ==
This marine species occurs off the Philippines.
