= Cuspivolva mucronata =

Scientific classification
- Kingdom: Animalia
- Phylum: Mollusca
- Class: Gastropoda
- Subclass: Caenogastropoda
- Order: Littorinimorpha
- Family: Ovulidae
- Genus: Cuspivolva
- Species: C. mucronata

Binomial name
- Cuspivolva mucronata (Azuma & Cate, 1971)

Synonyms
- Crenavolva mucronata (Azuma & Cate, 1971); Primovula mucronata Azuma & Cate, 1971

Species of gastropod

Cuspivolva mucronata is a species of sea snail in the family Ovulidae, the ovulids, cowry allies or false cowries.
