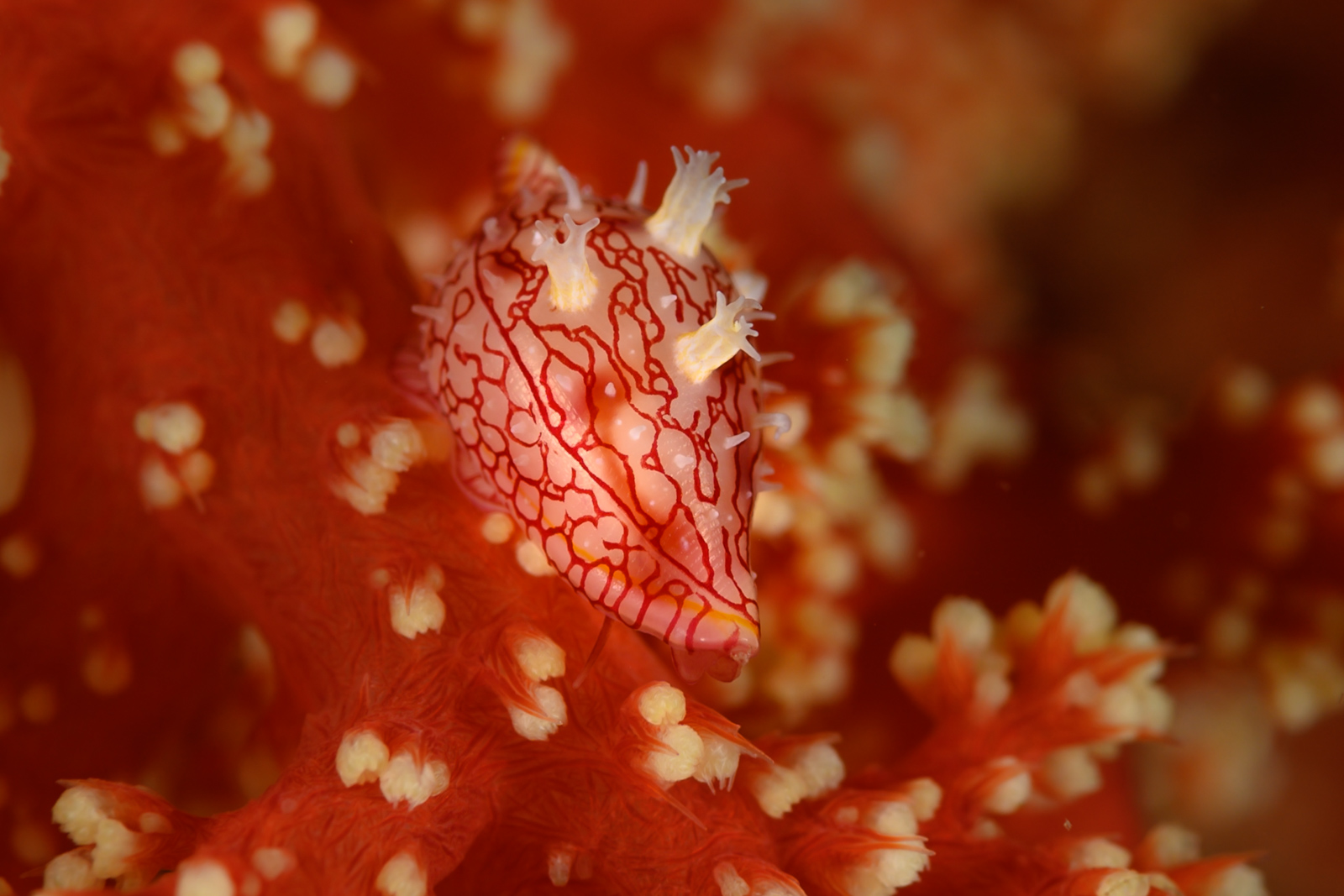

Scientific classification
- Kingdom: Animalia
- Phylum: Mollusca
- Class: Gastropoda
- Subclass: Caenogastropoda
- Order: Littorinimorpha
- Family: Ovulidae
- Genus: Serratovolva
- Species: S. dondani

Binomial name
- Serratovolva dondani (Cate, 1964)

Synonyms
- Crenavolva dondani (Cate, 1964); Crenavolva imitabilis Cate, 1973; Crenavolva imitabilis gabrielae Nicolay & Biraghi, 1990; Primovula dondani Cate, 1964

= Serratovolva dondani =

Species of gastropod

Serratovolva dondani is a species of sea snail, a marine gastropod mollusk in the family Ovulidae, the ovulids, cowry allies or false cowries.
