= Dentiovula azumai =

Scientific classification
- Kingdom: Animalia
- Phylum: Mollusca
- Class: Gastropoda
- Subclass: Caenogastropoda
- Order: Littorinimorpha
- Family: Ovulidae
- Genus: Dentiovula
- Species: D. azumai

Binomial name
- Dentiovula azumai (Cate, 1970)

Synonyms
- Crenavolva azumai (Cate, 1970); Crenavolva curiosa Cate, 1973; Primovula azumai Cate, 1970; Primovula myrakeenae Azuma & Cate, 1971

Species of gastropod

Dentiovula azumai is a species of sea snail in the family Ovulidae, the ovulids, cowry allies or false cowries.
