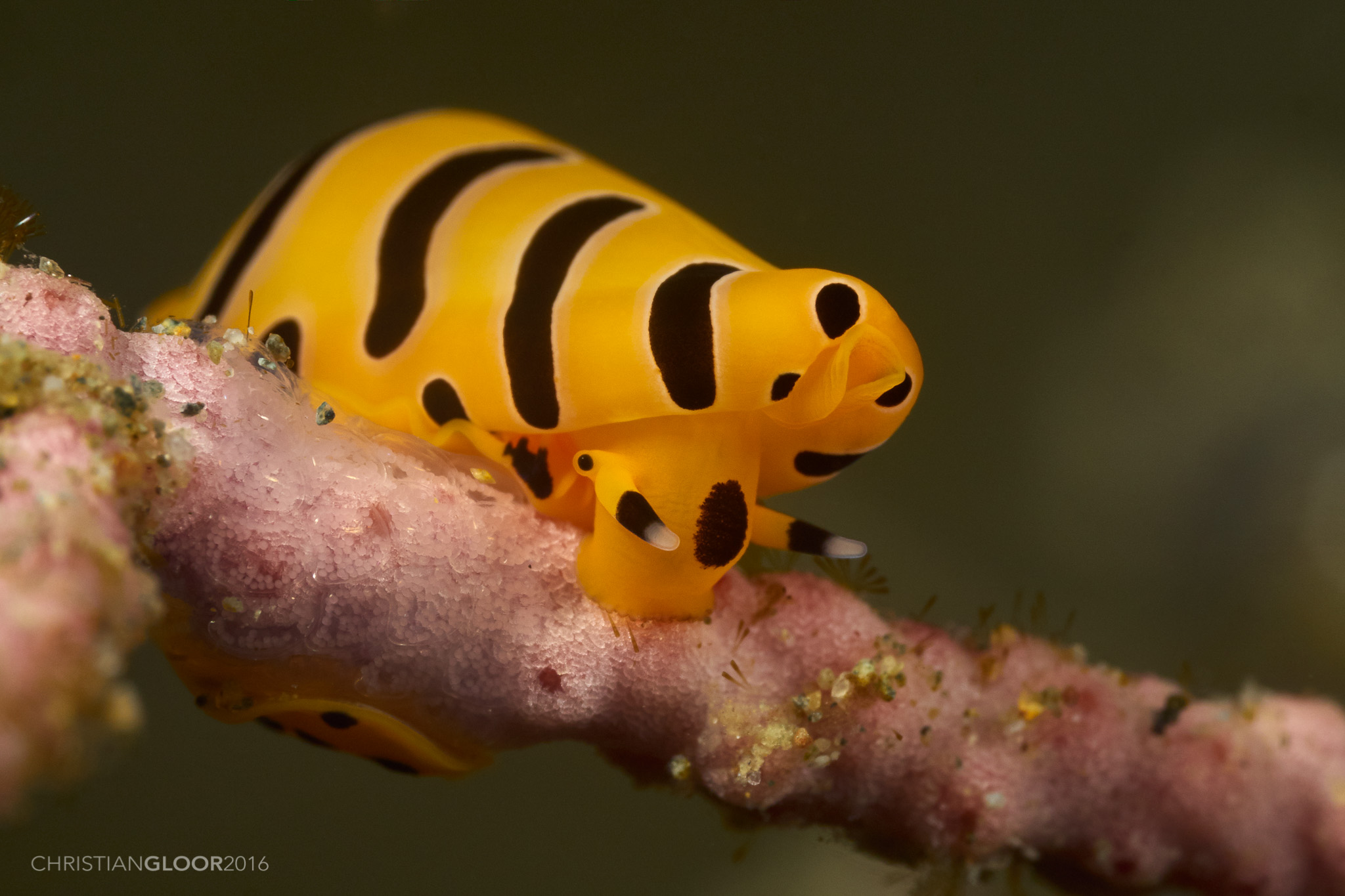

Scientific classification
- Kingdom: Animalia
- Phylum: Mollusca
- Class: Gastropoda
- Subclass: Caenogastropoda
- Order: Littorinimorpha
- Family: Ovulidae
- Genus: Cuspivolva
- Species: C. tigris

Binomial name
- Cuspivolva tigris (Yamamoto, 1971)

Synonyms
- Crenavolva tigris (Yamamoto, 1971); Primovula tigris Yamamoto, 1971

= Cuspivolva tigris =

Species of gastropod

Cuspivolva tigris, known commonly as the Tiger egg cowry, is a species of sea snail, a marine gastropod mollusk in the family Ovulidae, the ovulids, cowry allies or false cowries.

== Description ==
The adult size is about 1.5 cm length. The shell is yellow to orange and as an oblong shape marked with lateral fine grooves. The mantle can cover entirely the shell and its colour is yellowish to orange with lateral lines outlined with white. The foot has the colouration as the mantle with small black dots.

== Distribution ==
The Tiger egg cowry is widespread throughout the tropical waters of the Indo-Pacific region.
