= Franz Alfred Schilder =

German biologist, taxonomist, malacologist, and animal geography professor

- Born: Franz Xaver Alfred Johann Schilder; 13 April 1896; Královské Vinohrady, Czech Republic
- Died: 11 August 1970 (aged 72); Halle, Germany
- Citizenship: Germany
- Known for: 400 scientific papers in malacology and entomology
- Spouse: Maria Schilder
- Scientific career
- Fields: malacology, zoology, entomology

Franz Xaver Alfred Johann Schilder (born 13 April 1896 in Královské Vinohrady, now a district of Prague, died 11 August 1970 in Halle ) was an Austrian-born German biologist, taxonomist, malacologist and honorary professor of animal geography.

== Life ==
Franz Alfred Schilder was born on 13 April 1896 in Prague suburbs. In 1908, Schilder moved to Vienna. Having graduated from school in 1914, he studied medicine, but the next year his studies were interrupted by war. After the war, he continued studies in ethnography, geography and paleontology. In 1921, he became a Doctor of Philosophy.

In 1922, Schilder emigrated to Germany. In Berlin he started attending the Entomological Museum. Around this time Schilder married Maria Heitrich, a German chemist. In 1925, Schilder already was a recognized scientist at Naumburg/Saale in the state institute for research on Phylloxera, remaining there until 1947. In 1945, Schilder became a professor of zoology at the University of Halle-sur-Saale where he taught zoogeography and statistics.

At first, he combined teaching at Halle with his primary work at Naumburg, however in 1947 he relocated to Halle and started teaching also genetics and anthropology. Between 1954 and 1963 Schilder also lectured one day a week in Leipzig. Schilder retired in 1962, but even after that he was invited to lecture frequently until 1966.

Schilder was a member of both English societies, of the German Zoological Society, the German Malacozoological Society, and an honorary member of the Hawaiian Malacological Society and the Keppel Bay Shell Club.

Franz Albert Schilder died on 11 August 1970 in Halle.

== Research ==
Since the time when Schilder read an ethnological work Muschelgeldstudien by O. Schneider, he became interested in studying the Cypraeacea and wrote his dissertation about it. Cypraeidae was Schilder’s main research interest throughout his life. Along with his wife, Maria Schilder they were a prolific team of mollusc systematists.

Schilder’s complete bibliography comprises over 400 titles, including malacological, entomological, biometrical, etc. as well as text books. Among others he published Lehrbuch der Allegomeinen Zoogeographie, a text which focuses on the recognition of biogeographic areas at all geographic scales. A summary and conclusion of his work “A Catalogue of living and fossil Cowries” was written jointly with his wife, Maria Schilder and published after his death in 1971.

Schilder established 45 new genera and 483 new species and subspecies. In his honor were named: the genus Schilderia Tomlin 1930; the recent species Lyncina schilderorum Iredale 1939, the fossil species Zoila schilderi Dey (1932) 1941, and the race Cypraea tigris schilderiana Cate 1961.
