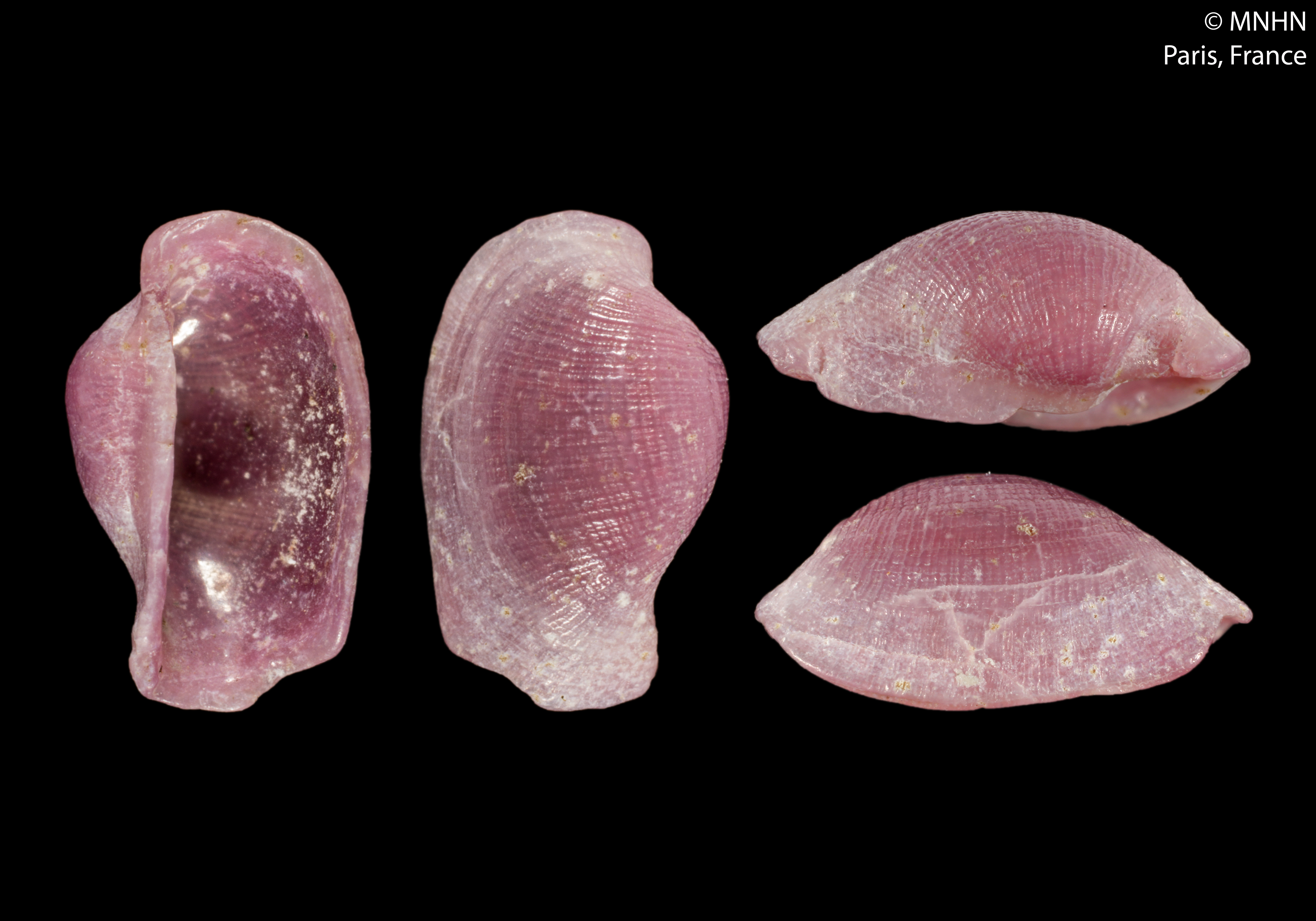
- Pedicularia elegantissima

Scientific classification
- Domain: Eukaryota
- Kingdom: Animalia
- Phylum: Mollusca
- Class: Gastropoda
- Subclass: Caenogastropoda
- Order: Littorinimorpha
- Family: Ovulidae
- Subfamily: Pediculariinae; Gray, 1853

Genera
- See text

Diversity
- 20 species

= Pediculariinae =

Subfamily of gastropods

Pediculariinae is a subfamily of small to large predatory or parasitic sea snails, marine gastropod molluscs in the family Ovulidae and the superfamily Cypraeoidea, the cowries and the cowry allies. As of 2009, it comprises 48 described species of which 20 are regarded as valid by most scientists.

== Taxonomy ==
Simone (2004) placed some genera in the family Pediculariidae which were previously in the family Ovulidae. Comparison of the shell, radula and morphology suggested a closer phylogenetic relationship to the Pediculariidae than to the Lamellariidae, the Eratoidae/Triviidae, or the Ovulidae. However, both the validity of the family Pediculariidae, and its proper position within the superfamily Cypraeoidea, remain controversial. As of 2019, the World Register of Marine Species considers it a subfamily of the family Ovulidae.

=== 2005 taxonomy ===
According to the taxonomy of Bouchet & Rocroi (2005) the subfamily Pediculariinae was included within the family Ovulidae.

=== 2007 taxonomy ===
Fehse (2007) raised the subfamily Pediculariinae to the level of family as Pediculariidae, based on morphological research on the radulae, the shell, the soft part morphology and molecular phylogeny research on the 16S ribosomal RNA gene.

== Genera ==
The subfamily Pediculariinae contains the following tribes and genera:

- tribe Cypraediini Schilder, 1927
  - † Cypraedia Swainson, 1840
  - † Eucypraedia Schilder, 1939
  - Jenneria Jousseaume, 1884
  - Pseudocypraea Schilder, 1925
- tribe Pediculariini Gray, 1853
  - † Cypraeopsis Schilder, 1936
  - Lunovula Rosenberg, 1990
  - Pedicularia Swainson, 1840
  - Pedicypraedia Lorenz, 2009
- not assigned to a tribe
  - † Cypropterina de Gregorio, 1880
  - † Lozouetina Dolin & Dockery, 2018
  - † Olianatrivia Dolin, Biosca-Munts & Parcerisa, 2013
  - † Transovula de Gregorio, 1880

== Description ==
The species in this subfamily differ in a radical way from other species in the Ovulidae by the morphology of the first and second marginal teeth in their radula. While these are symmetrical (and even palmaceous) in the Ovulidae, they are asymmetrical, as can be seen in Pseudocypraea adamsonii Sowerby, 1832 (formed like a swatter) or in Jenneria pustulata and Pedicularia sicula (formed like a whip).

== Feeding habits ==
These sea snails feed on stony corals (Scleractinia) and hydrozoans.
