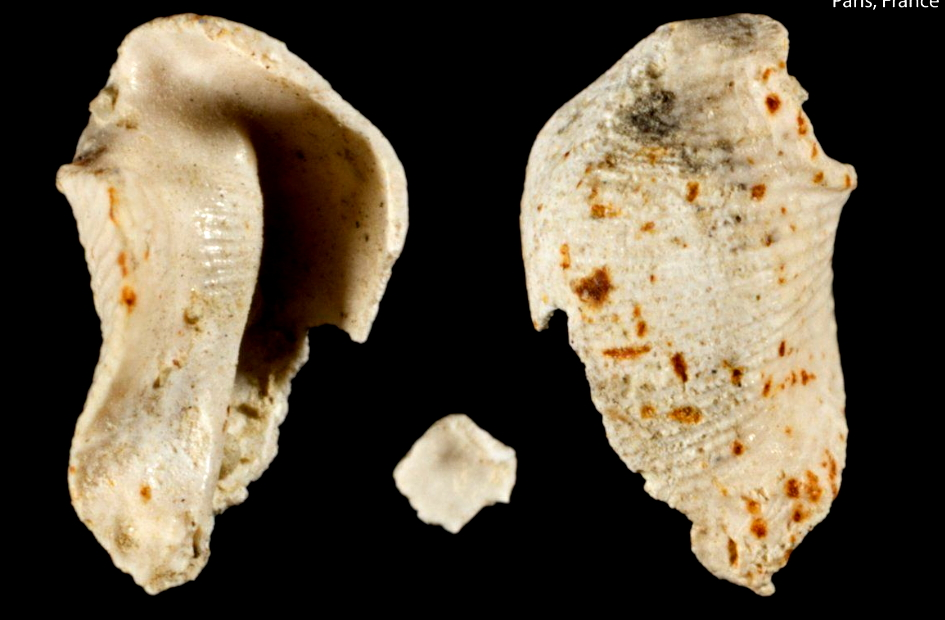
- Shell of Pedicularia deshayesiana (syntype at MNHN, Paris)

Scientific classification
- Kingdom: Animalia
- Phylum: Mollusca
- Class: Gastropoda
- Subclass: Caenogastropoda
- Order: Littorinimorpha
- Family: Ovulidae
- Genus: Pedicularia
- Species: †P. deshayesiana

Binomial name
- †Pedicularia deshayesiana G. Seguenza, 1865

= Pedicularia deshayesiana =

Species of gastropod

Pedicularia deshayesiana is an extinct species of sea snail, a marine gastropod mollusk in the family Pediculariidae, one of the families of cowry allies.

== Description ==
(Original description in French) The small shell is not very solid. It is elongate-ovate, and often quite irregular. It shows fine, elevated transverse lines that extend all the way to the margins; toward the upper region, these lines are arranged almost concentrically around the apex. In the adult stage, the spire is entirely internal and is moderately developed, so that the shell appears inflated at its central part. The apex is sublateral. The aperture is elongate, flexuous, irregular, and almost canaliculated at the lower part, and it widens on the exterior due to the development of the margins. However, it narrows at its internal part, which assumes a consistently regular, semilunate shape.

The margins are simple, flexuous, and irregularly dilated. On the exterior, they present faint growth striae in addition to the transverse lines, which are well-marked. The irregularity often displayed by the shell depends entirely on the conformation of these margins. At the lower part, they fold back to form a sinus, which renders the aperture almost canaliculated. Toward the upper region, they curve laterally to form a wider sinus that almost reaches the apex of the shell. At the internal part, where the aperture narrows, the columellar margin is adorned with fine, numerous transverse plications, while the opposite margin forms a swelling that resembles a cord ornamented with small denticulations.

== Distribution ==
Fossils of this species have been found in Miocene strata about Messina, Italy; also finds in Spain.
