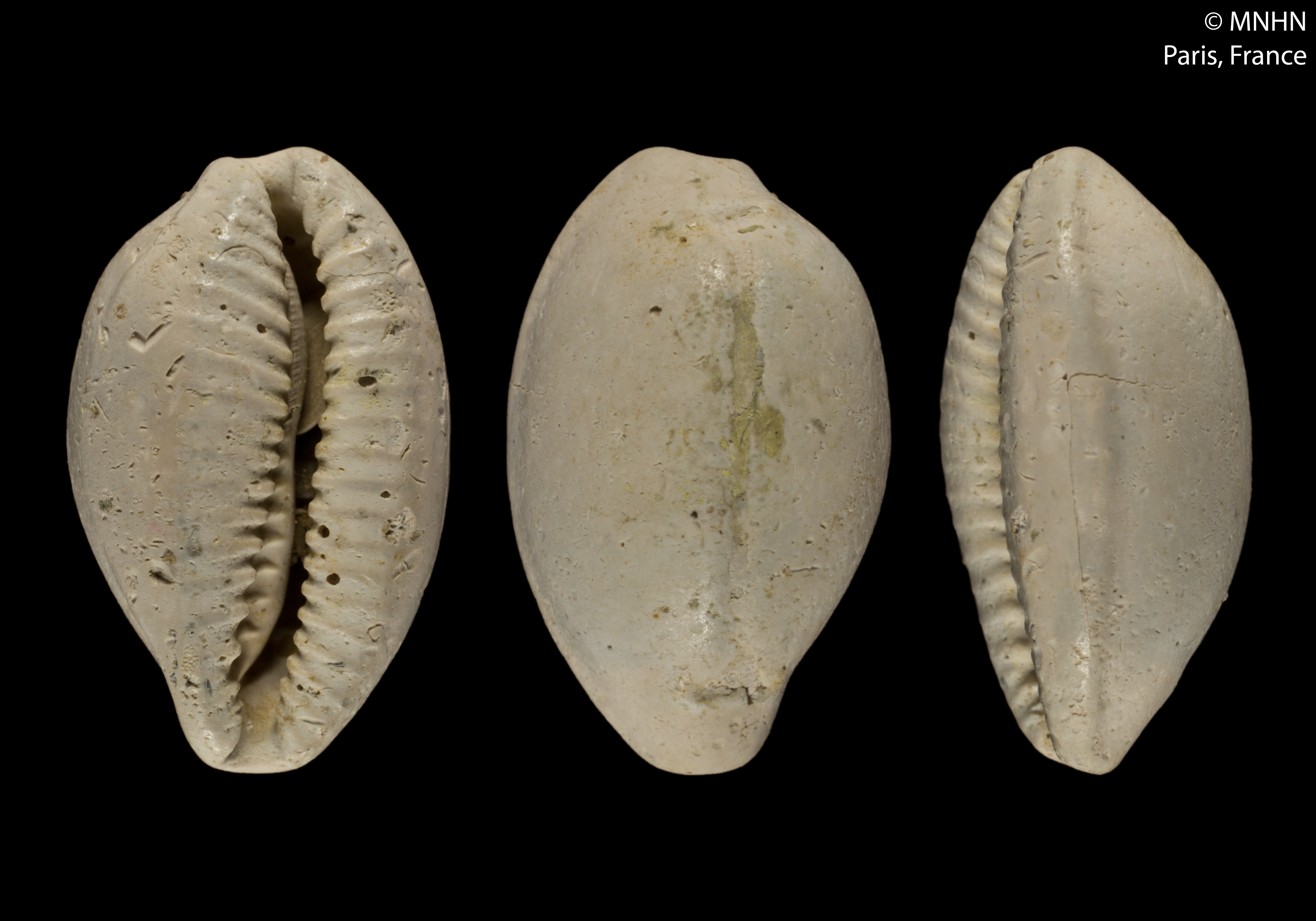
- Shell of † Cypraeopsis aquensis (holotype at MNHN, Paris)

Scientific classification
- Kingdom: Animalia
- Phylum: Mollusca
- Class: Gastropoda
- Subclass: Caenogastropoda
- Order: Littorinimorpha
- Superfamily: Cypraeoidea
- Family: Ovulidae
- Subfamily: Pediculariinae
- Genus: †Cypraeopsis; Schilder, 1936

Type species
- † Cypraeopsis vandervlerki Schilder, 1936

= Cypraeopsis =

Extinct genus of gastropods

Cypraeopsis is an extinct genus of sea snails, marine gastropod mollusks in the family Ovulidae, one of the families of cowry allies.

== Species ==
Species within the genus Cypraeopsis include:

- † Cypraeopsis aquensis Dolin & Lozouet, 2004
- † Cypraeopsis vandervlerki Schilder, 1936

Species brought into synonymy

- Cypraeopsis superstes Dolin, 1991: synonym of Lunovula superstes (Dolin, 1991)
