= P. elegantissima =

P. elegantissima may refer to:

- Pedicularia elegantissima, a sea snail species
- Phaegoptera elegantissima, a synonym for Anaxita decorata, the decorated beauty, a moth species found in Mexico and Central America
