= Pseudocypraea alexhuberti =

Scientific classification
- Kingdom: Animalia
- Phylum: Mollusca
- Class: Gastropoda
- Subclass: Caenogastropoda
- Order: Littorinimorpha
- Family: Ovulidae
- Genus: Pseudocypraea
- Species: P. alexhuberti

Binomial name
- Pseudocypraea alexhuberti Lorenz, 2006

Species of gastropod

Pseudocypraea alexhuberti is a species of sea snail, a marine gastropod mollusk in the family Ovulidae, one of the families of cowry allies.
