= Pedicypraedia =

Scientific classification
- Kingdom: Animalia
- Phylum: Mollusca
- Class: Gastropoda
- Subclass: Caenogastropoda
- Order: Littorinimorpha
- Family: Ovulidae
- Subfamily: Pediculariinae
- Genus: Pedicypraedia; Lorenz, 2009

Genus of gastropods

Pedicypraedia is a genus of sea snails, marine gastropod mollusks in the family Ovulidae, one of the families of cowry allies.

== Species ==
Species within the genus Pedicypraedia include:

- Pedicypraedia atlantica Lorenz, 2009
