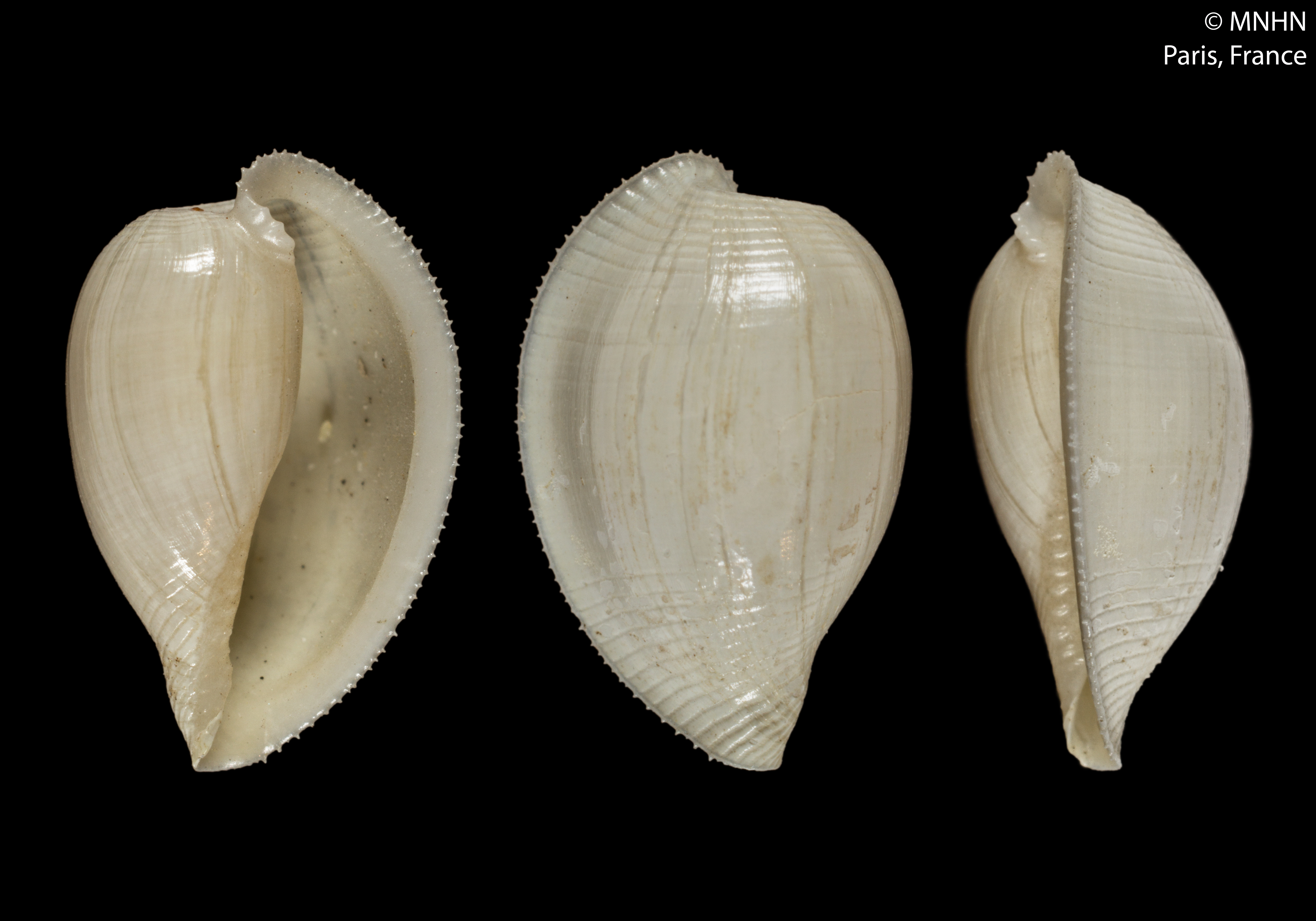
- Shell of Lunovula serrata (holotype at MNHN, Paris)

Scientific classification
- Kingdom: Animalia
- Phylum: Mollusca
- Class: Gastropoda
- Subclass: Caenogastropoda
- Order: Littorinimorpha
- Superfamily: Cypraeoidea
- Family: Ovulidae
- Subfamily: Pediculariinae
- Genus: Lunovula; Rosenberg, 1990

Type species
- Lunovula finleyi Rosenberg, 1990

= Lunovula =

Genus of gastropods

Lunovula is a genus of sea snails, marine gastropod mollusks in the subfamily Pediculariinae of the family Ovulidae, one of the families of cowry allies.

== Species ==
Species within the genus Lunovula include:

- Lunovula boucheti Lorenz, 2007
- Lunovula cancellata Lorenz, 2007
- Lunovula finleyi Rosenberg, 1990
- Lunovula serrata Lorenz & Bouchet, 2018
- Lunovula superstes (Dolin, 1991)

Species brought into synonymy

- Lunovula venusta Tsuchida & Kurozumi, 1999: synonym of Lunovula superstes (Dolin, 1991)
