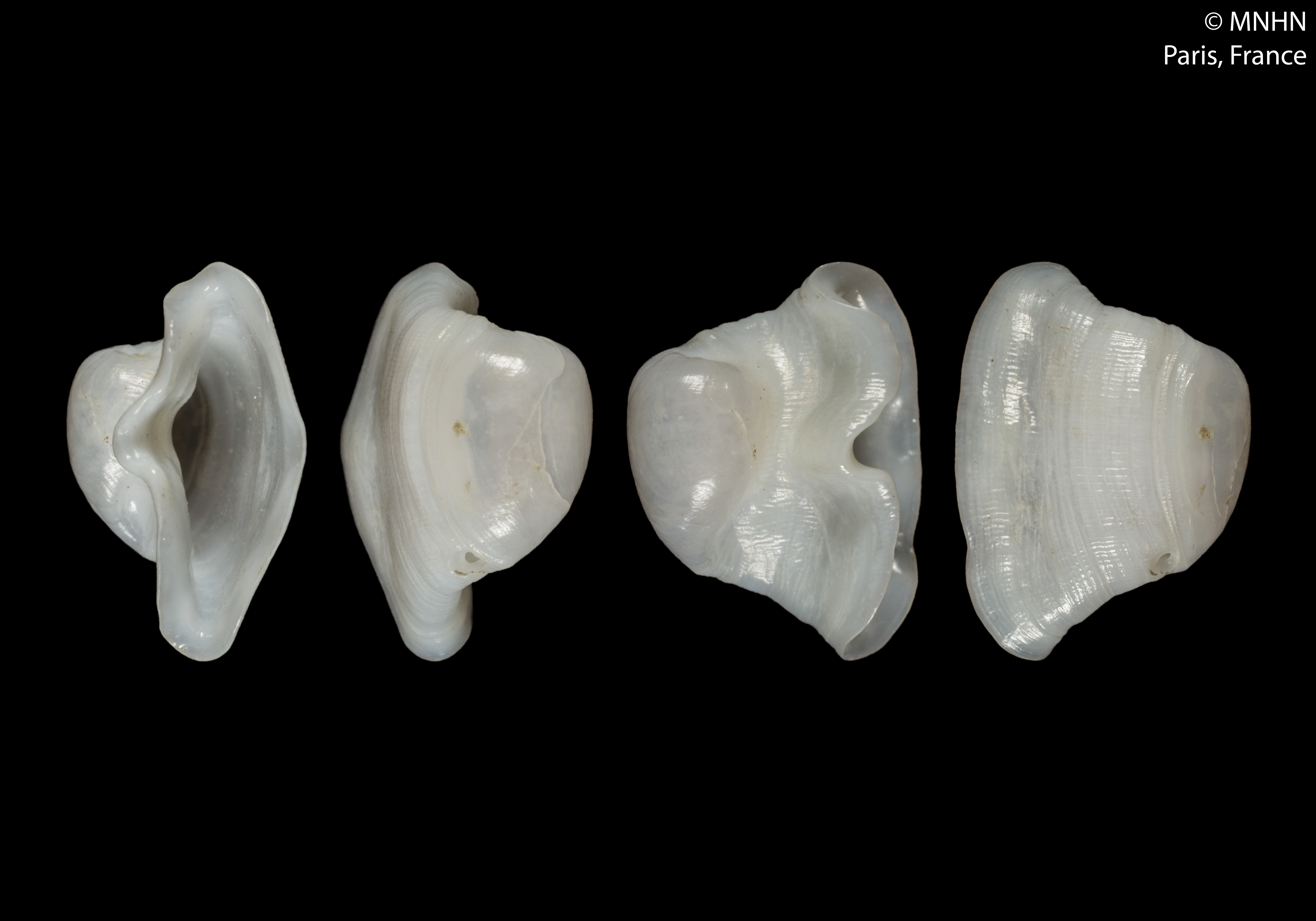
- Shell of Pedicularia splendida (holotype at MNHN, Paris)

Scientific classification
- Kingdom: Animalia
- Phylum: Mollusca
- Class: Gastropoda
- Subclass: Caenogastropoda
- Order: Littorinimorpha
- Family: Ovulidae
- Genus: Pedicularia
- Species: P. splendida

Binomial name
- Pedicularia splendida Lorenz, 2009

= Pedicularia splendida =

Species of gastropod

Pedicularia splendida is a species of sea snail, a marine gastropod mollusk in the family Ovulidae, one of the families of cowry allies.

== Description ==
The length of the shell attains 10.5 mm.

== Distribution ==
This species was found on the Hyères Seamount, Northeast Atlantic.
