= Pedicularia decussata =

Scientific classification
- Kingdom: Animalia
- Phylum: Mollusca
- Class: Gastropoda
- Subclass: Caenogastropoda
- Order: Littorinimorpha
- Family: Ovulidae
- Genus: Pedicularia
- Species: P. decussata

Binomial name
- Pedicularia decussata (Gould, 1855)

Synonyms
- Pedicularia albida Dall, 1881; Pedicularia bonfigliolii Cossignani, 2006; Pedicularia tibia Simone, 2005

Species of gastropod

Pedicularia decussata is a species of sea snail, a marine gastropod mollusk in the family Ovulidae, one of the families of cowry allies.

== Distribution ==
- Caribbean Sea
- Cuba
- Gulf of Mexico

== Description ==
The maximum recorded shell length is 13 mm.

== Habitat ==
The minimum recorded depth is 49 m. The maximum recorded depth is 1170 m.
