= Pedicularia vanderlandi =

Scientific classification
- Kingdom: Animalia
- Phylum: Mollusca
- Class: Gastropoda
- Subclass: Caenogastropoda
- Order: Littorinimorpha
- Family: Ovulidae
- Genus: Pedicularia
- Species: P. vanderlandi

Binomial name
- Pedicularia vanderlandi Goud & Hoeksema, 2001

Species of gastropod

Pedicularia vanderlandi is a species of sea snail, a marine gastropod mollusk in the family Ovulidae, one of the families of cowry allies.
