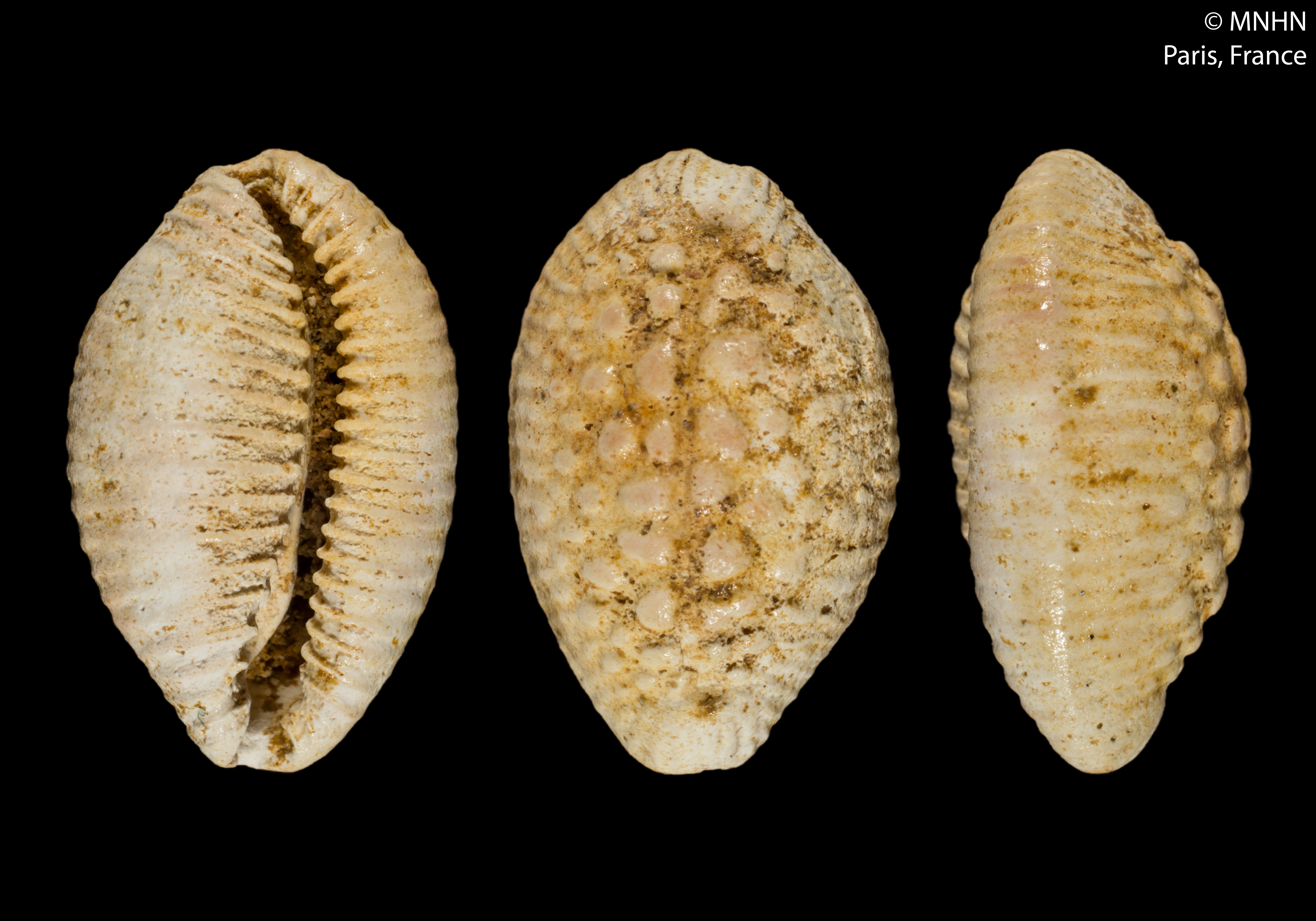
- Shell of Jenneria nodulosa

Scientific classification
- Kingdom: Animalia
- Phylum: Mollusca
- Class: Gastropoda
- Subclass: Caenogastropoda
- Order: Littorinimorpha
- Superfamily: Cypraeoidea
- Family: Ovulidae
- Subfamily: Pediculariinae
- Genus: Jenneria; Jousseaume, 1884

Synonyms
- Cypraeotrivia Vredenburg, 1920

= Jenneria =

Genus of gastropods

Jenneria is a genus of sea snails, marine gastropod mollusks in the family Ovulidae, one of the families of cowry allies.

== Species ==
Species within the genus Jenneria include:

- † Jenneria nodulosa Dolin & Lozouet, 2004
- Jenneria pustulata (Lightfoot, 1786)
