= Pedicularia pacifica =

Scientific classification
- Kingdom: Animalia
- Phylum: Mollusca
- Class: Gastropoda
- Subclass: Caenogastropoda
- Order: Littorinimorpha
- Family: Ovulidae
- Genus: Pedicularia
- Species: P. pacifica

Binomial name
- Pedicularia pacifica Pease, 1865

Synonyms
- Pedicularia stylasteris Hedley, 1903; Pediculariona stylasteris Iredale, 1935; Pedicularia maoria Powell, 1937

Species of gastropod

Pedicularia pacifica is a species of small predatory or ectoparasitic sea snail, a cowry-like marine gastropod mollusc in the family Ovulidae, the cowry allies.

These snails live on and feed on certain corals.
