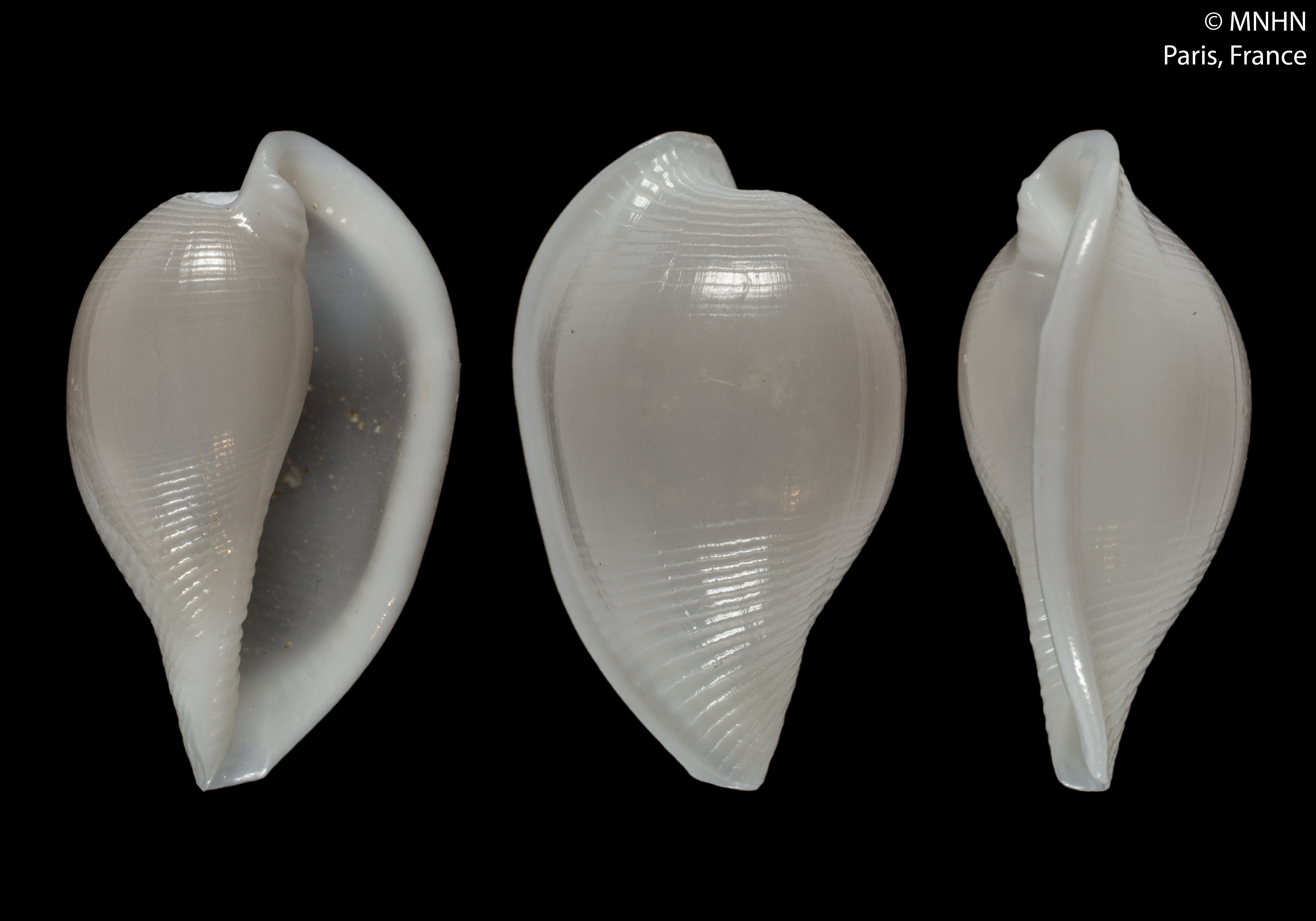
- Shell of Lunovula boucheti (holotype at MNHN, Paris)

Scientific classification
- Kingdom: Animalia
- Phylum: Mollusca
- Class: Gastropoda
- Subclass: Caenogastropoda
- Order: Littorinimorpha
- Family: Ovulidae
- Genus: Lunovula
- Species: L. boucheti

Binomial name
- Lunovula boucheti Lorenz, 2007

= Lunovula boucheti =

Species of gastropod

Lunovula boucheti is a species of sea snail, a marine gastropod mollusk in the family Ovulidae, one of the families of cowry allies.

== Description ==
The length of the shell attains 16.6 mm. The shell is spindle-shaped with a glossy surface and displays a pale cream to whitish base color, often with a light pink or orangish tinge at both extremities. The dorsum is smooth without transverse ridges, and the terminal ends are moderately produced. Like other members of the genus Lunovula, it has a distinctive crescent-shaped aperture.

== Distribution ==
This marine species occurs off New Caledonia.
