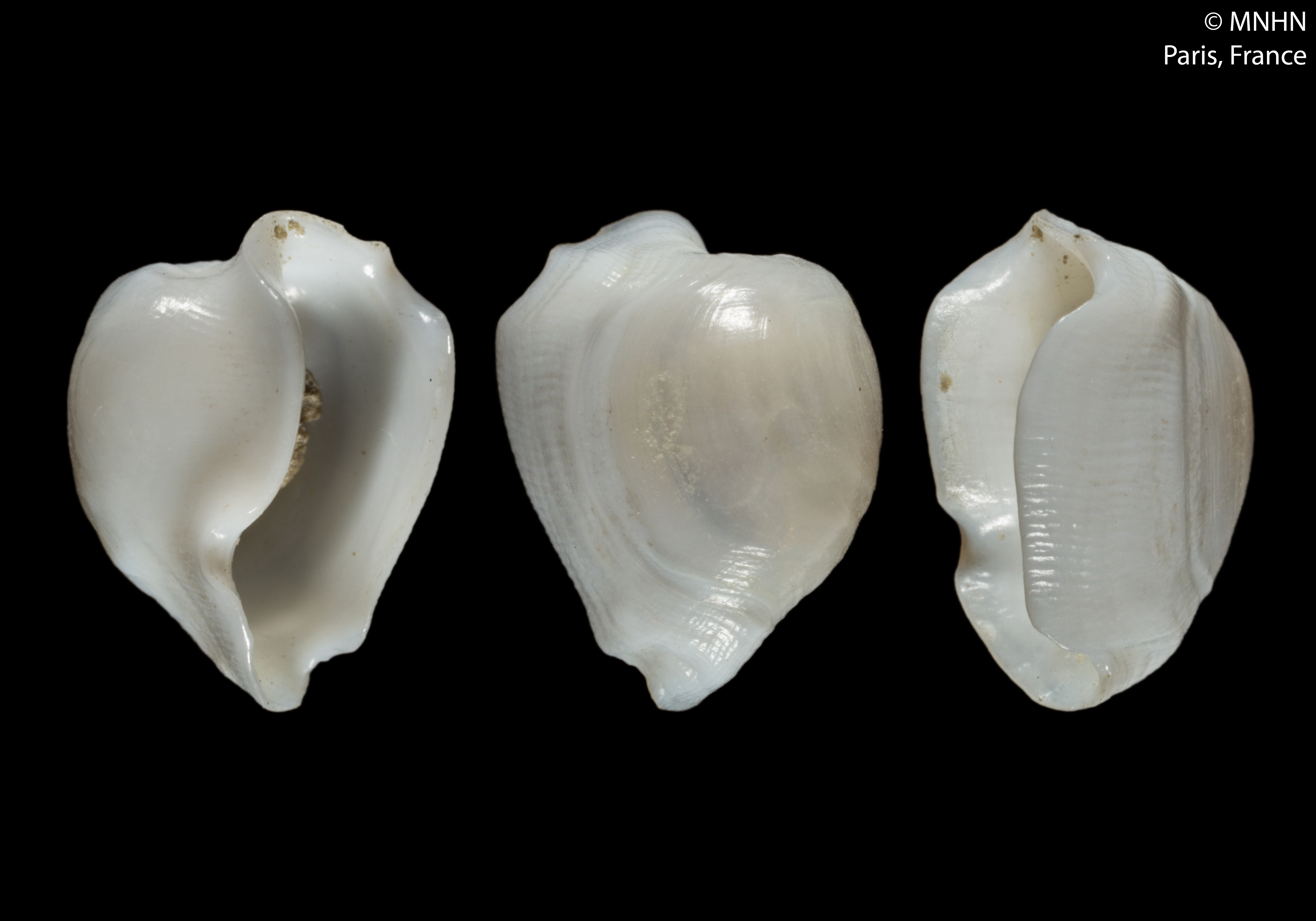
- Shell of Pedicularia decurvata (syntype at MNHN, Paris)

Scientific classification
- Kingdom: Animalia
- Phylum: Mollusca
- Class: Gastropoda
- Subclass: Caenogastropoda
- Order: Littorinimorpha
- Family: Ovulidae
- Genus: Pedicularia
- Species: P. decurvata

Binomial name
- Pedicularia decurvata Locard, 1897

= Pedicularia decurvata =

Species of gastropod

Pedicularia decurvata is a species of sea snail, a marine gastropod mollusk in the family Ovulidae, one of the families of cowry allies.

== Distribution ==
This bathyal marine species occurs off the Azores.
