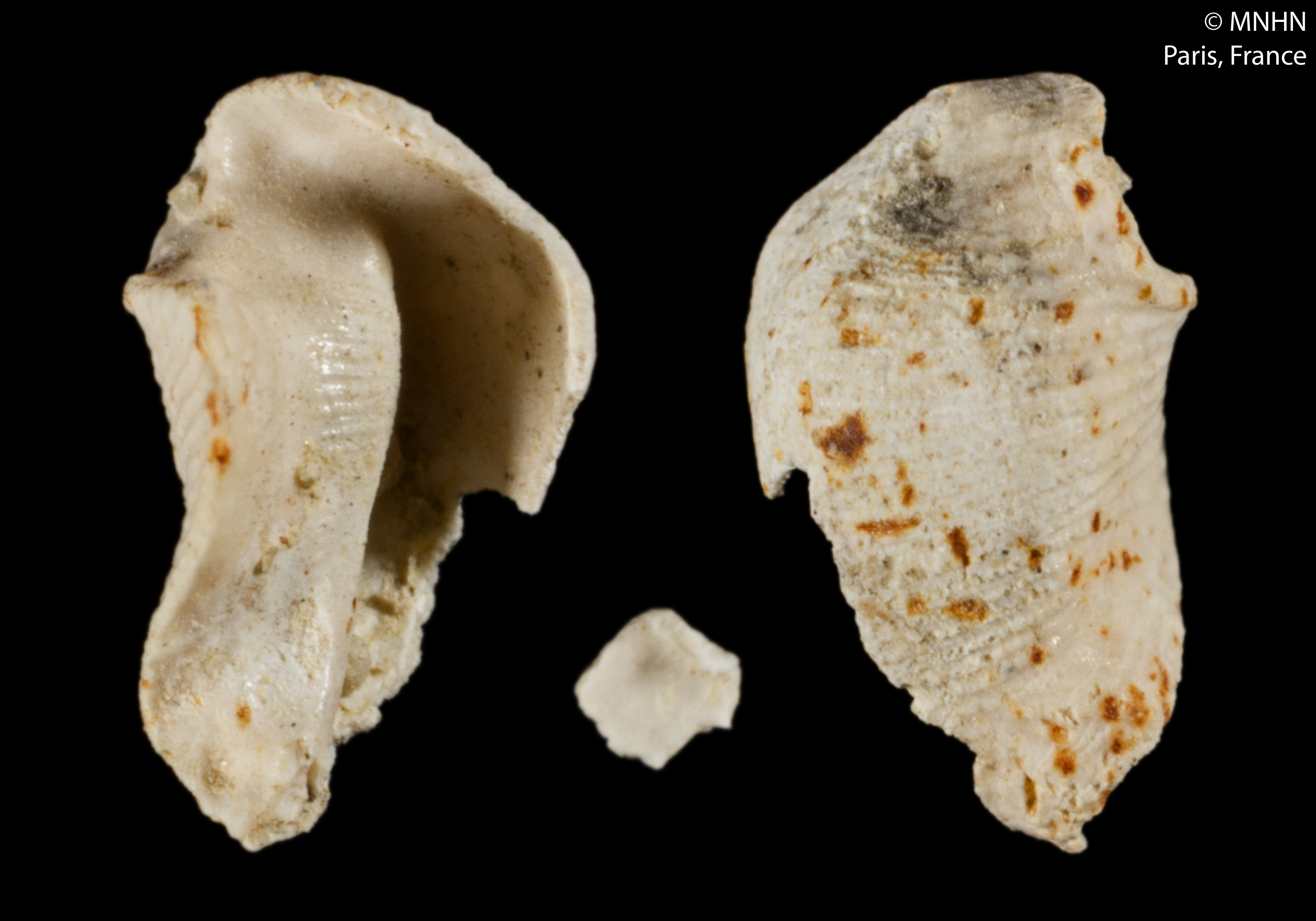
- Shell of Pedicularia sicula (syntype at MNHN, Paris)

Scientific classification
- Kingdom: Animalia
- Phylum: Mollusca
- Class: Gastropoda
- Subclass: Caenogastropoda
- Order: Littorinimorpha
- Family: Ovulidae
- Genus: Pedicularia
- Species: P. sicula

Binomial name
- Pedicularia sicula Swainson, 1840

Synonyms
- Calyptraea polymorpha Calcara, 1842; Mioseguenzia cimbrica recens F. Nordsieck, 1973; Mioseguenzia conica F. Nordsieck, 1973; Pedicularia sicula var. sublevigata Locard, 1897; Thyreus paradoxus Philippi, 1844

= Pedicularia sicula =

Species of gastropod

Pedicularia sicula is a species of sea snail, a marine gastropod mollusk in the family Pediculariidae, one of the families of cowry allies.

== Distribution ==
This species occurs in the East Atlantic, the Azores, Cape Verde, the Canary Islands, Madeira, European waters and the Mediterranean Sea (Sicily).
