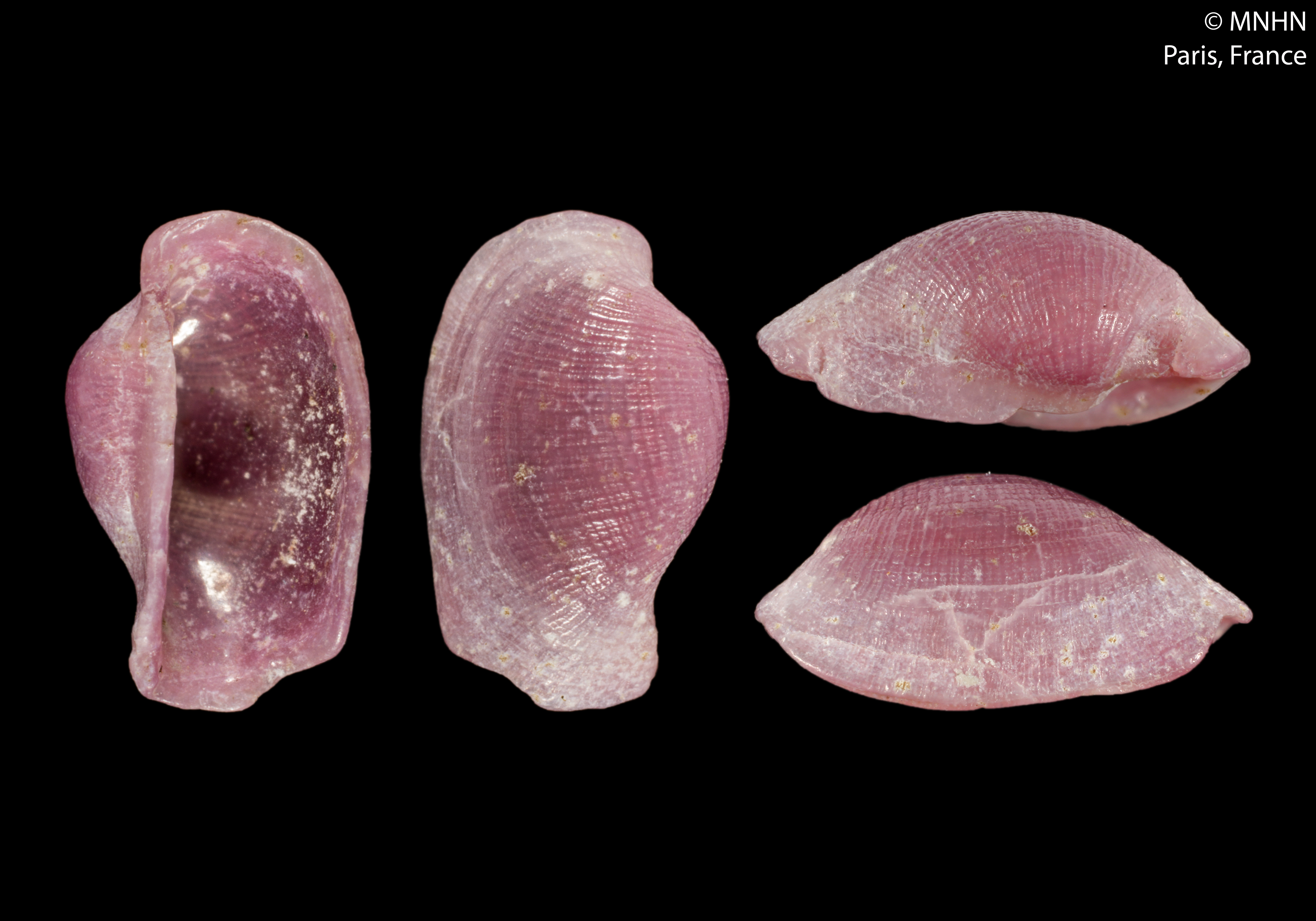
- Pedicularia elegantissima

Scientific classification
- Kingdom: Animalia
- Phylum: Mollusca
- Class: Gastropoda
- Subclass: Caenogastropoda
- Order: Littorinimorpha
- Superfamily: Cypraeoidea
- Family: Ovulidae
- Subfamily: Pediculariinae
- Genus: Pedicularia; Swainson, 1840

Type species
- Pedicularia sicula Swainson, 1840

Species
- See text

Synonyms
- Mioseguenzia Nordsieck, 1973; Pediculariella Thiele, 1925; Pediculariona Iredale, 1935; Thyreus Philippi, 1844

= Pedicularia =

Genus of sea snails

Pedicularia is a genus of small predatory or ectoparasitic sea snails, cowry-like marine gastropod molluscs in the family Ovulidae, the cowry allies.

In Peducularia sicula, the protoconch protrudes.

These snails live on and feed on certain corals.

== Species ==
Species within the genus Pedicularia include:

- Pedicularia californica (Newcomb, 1864) - California pedicularia
- Pedicularia dautzenbergi (Schilder, 1931)
- Pedicularia decurvata Locard, 1897
- Pedicularia decussata (Gould, 1855) - hatched pedicularia
- † Pedicularia deshayesiana G. Seguenza, 1865
- Pedicularia elegantissima Deshayes, 1863
- Pedicularia granulata Neubert, 1998
- Pedicularia japonica Dall, 1871
- Pedicularia morrisoni Lorenz, 2013
- Pedicularia pacifica Pease, 1865
- Pedicularia sicula Swainson, 1840
- Pedicularia splendida Lorenz, 2009
- Pedicularia stylasteris Hedley, 1903
- Pedicularia subtilis Schilder, 1931
- Pedicularia vanderlandi Goud & Hoeksema, 2001

Species brought into synonymy

- Pedicularia albida Dall, 1881: synonym of Pedicularia decussata Gould, 1855
- Pedicularia bonfigliolii Cossignani, 2006: synonym of Pedicularia decussata Gould, 1855
- Pedicularia deshayesiana Seguenza, 1865: synonym of Pedicularia sicula Swainson, 1840
- Pedicularia ovuliformis Berry, 1946: synonym of Pedicularia californica Newcomb, 1864
- Pedicularia tibia Simone, 2005: synonym of Pedicularia decussata Gould, 1855
