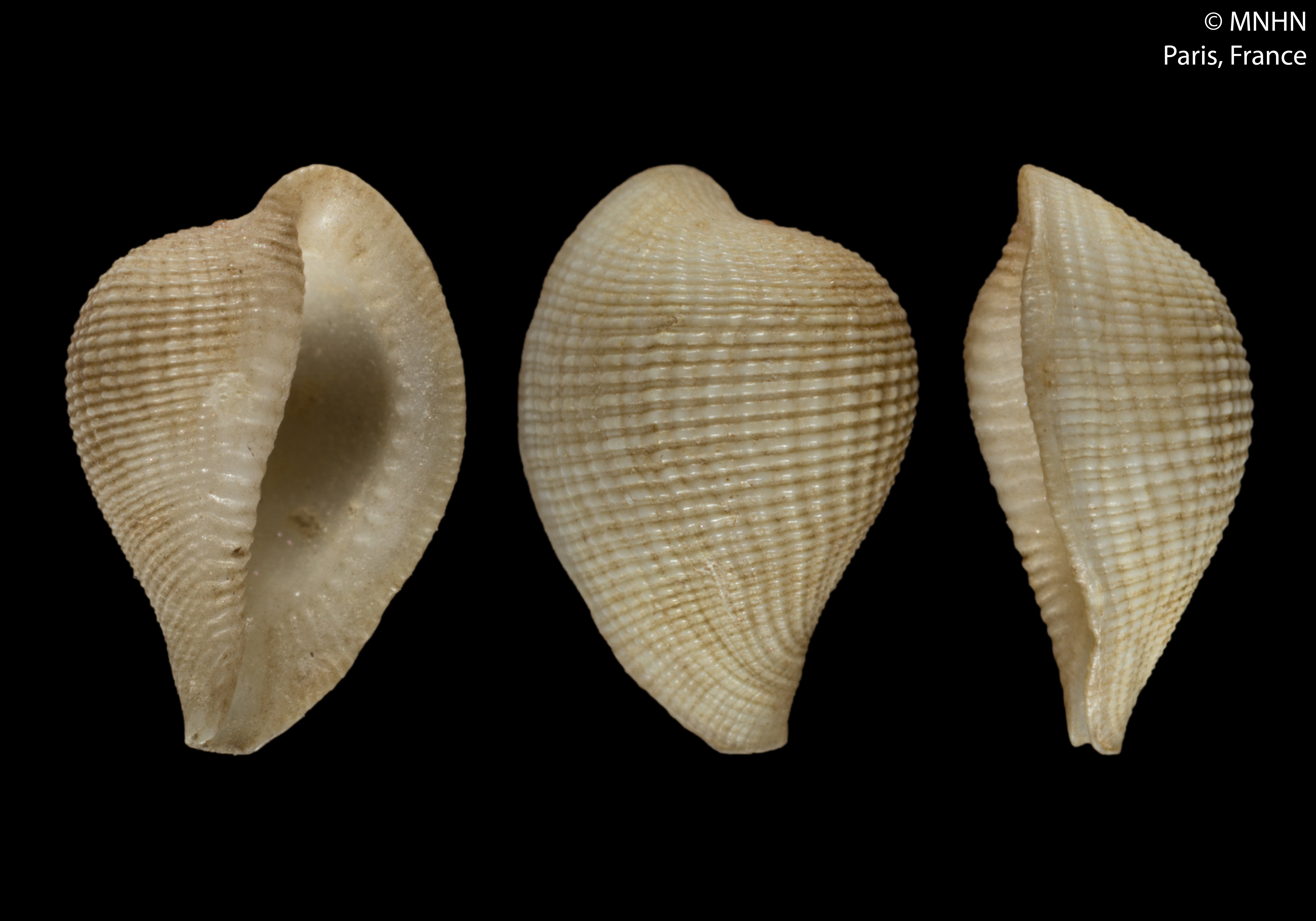
- Shell of Lunovula cancellata (holotype at MNHN, Paris)

Scientific classification
- Kingdom: Animalia
- Phylum: Mollusca
- Class: Gastropoda
- Subclass: Caenogastropoda
- Order: Littorinimorpha
- Family: Ovulidae
- Genus: Lunovula
- Species: L. cancellata

Binomial name
- Lunovula cancellata Lorenz, 2007

= Lunovula cancellata =

Species of gastropod

Lunovula cancellata is a species of sea snail, a marine gastropod mollusk in the family Ovulidae, one of the families of cowry allies.

== Description ==
The length of the shell attains 3.9-9 mm with an average length of 6.4 mm (0.25 in).

This species has the Shell ID: 52269

== Distribution ==
This marine species occurs off the Solomon Islands, the Philippines and Réunion.
