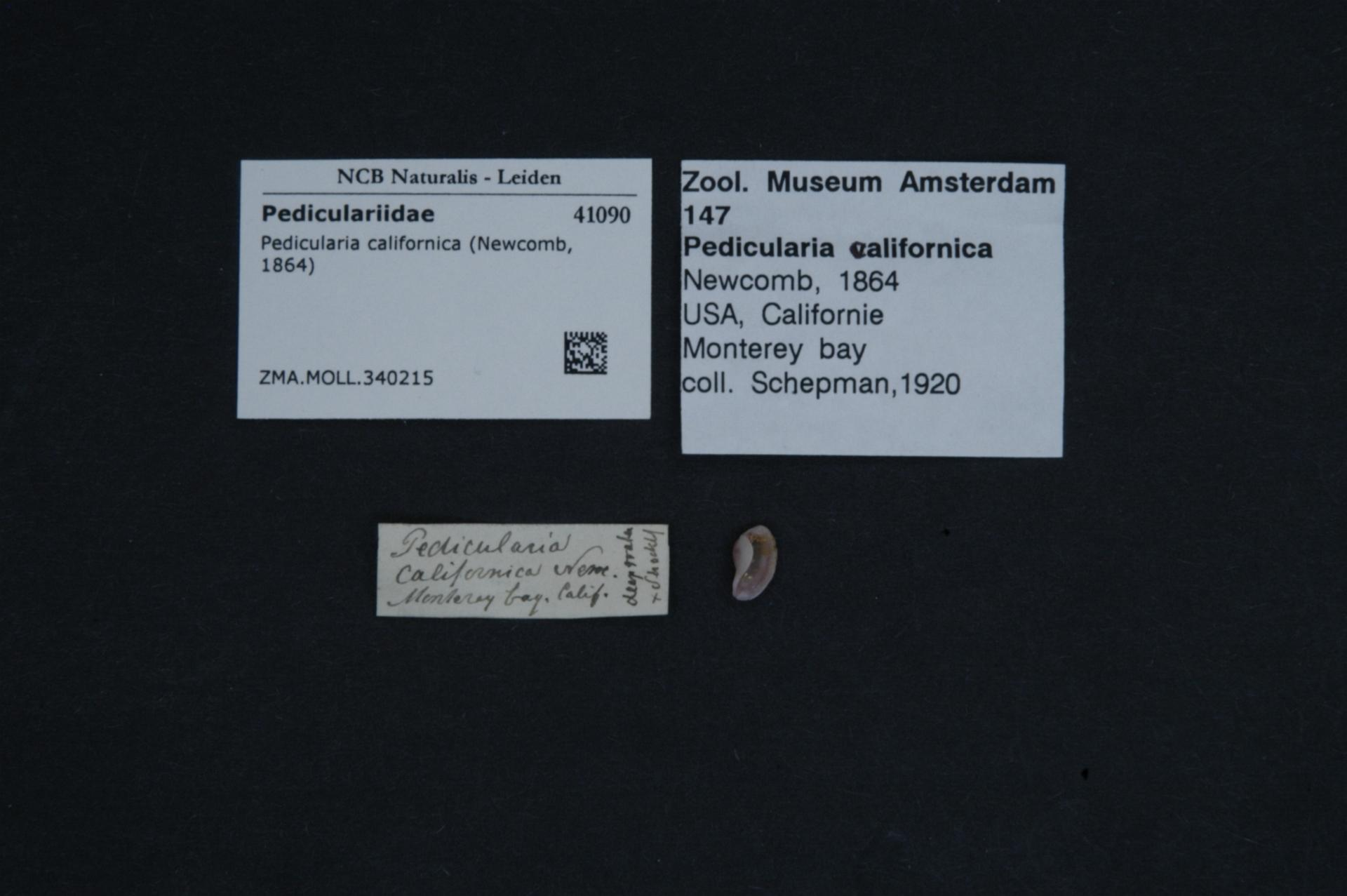
- Pedicularia californica (Newcomb, 1864) – Pediculariidae – Mollusc shell

Scientific classification
- Kingdom: Animalia
- Phylum: Mollusca
- Class: Gastropoda
- Subclass: Caenogastropoda
- Order: Littorinimorpha
- Family: Ovulidae
- Genus: Pedicularia
- Species: P. californica

Binomial name
- Pedicularia californica (Newcomb, 1864)

Synonyms
- Pedicularia ovuliformis Berry, 1946

= Pedicularia californica =

Species of sea snail

Pedicularia californica is a species of sea snail, a marine gastropod mollusk in the family Ovulidae, one of the families of cowry allies.

== Distribution ==
In deeper water, California coast and Channel islands.
