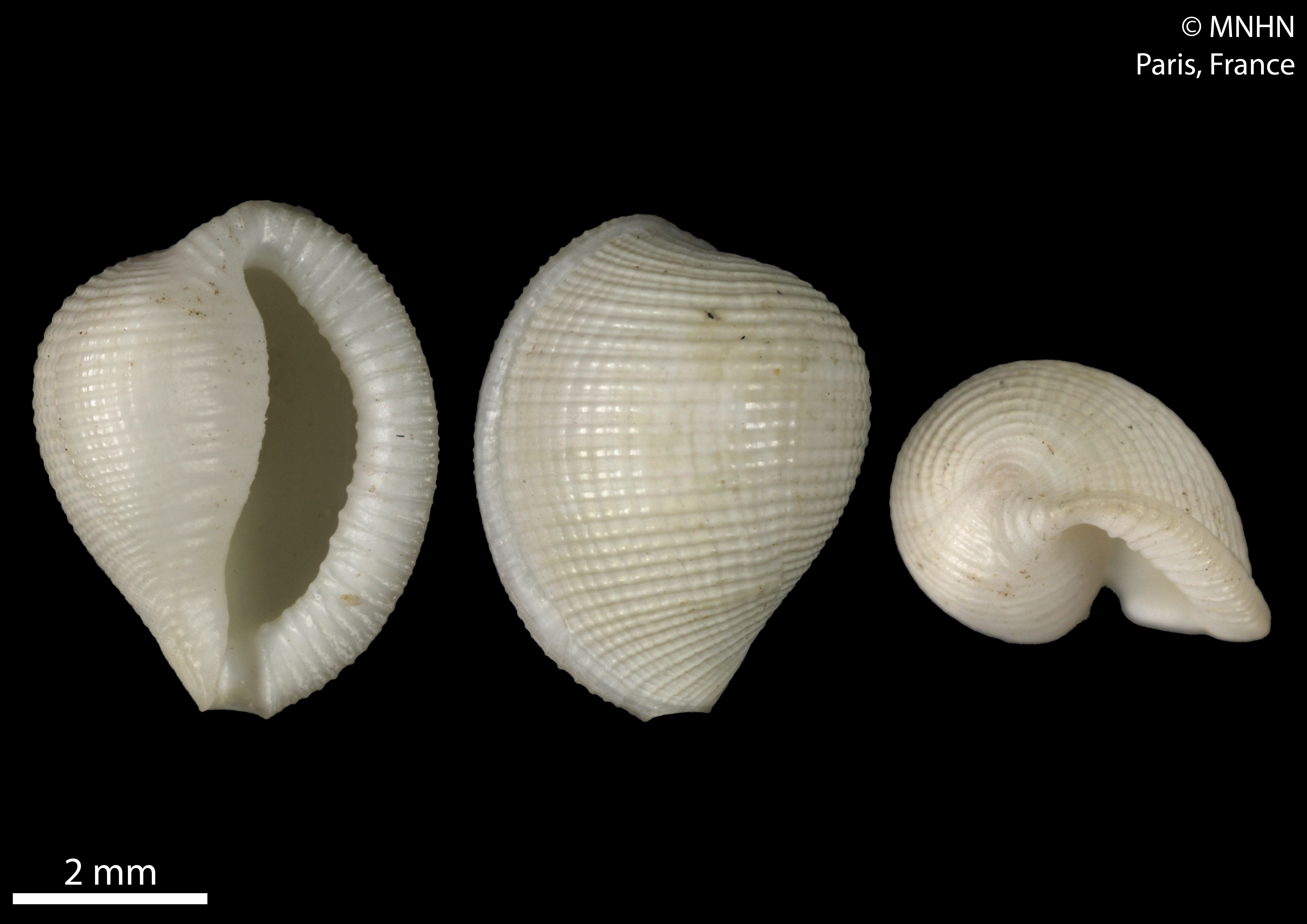
- Shell of Lunovula finleyi (specimen at MNHN, Paris)

Scientific classification
- Kingdom: Animalia
- Phylum: Mollusca
- Class: Gastropoda
- Subclass: Caenogastropoda
- Order: Littorinimorpha
- Family: Ovulidae
- Genus: Lunovula
- Species: L. finleyi

Binomial name
- Lunovula finleyi Rosenberg, 1990

= Lunovula finleyi =

Species of gastropod

Lunovula finleyi is a species of sea snail, a marine gastropod mollusk in the family Ovulidae, one of the families of cowry allies.

== Distribution ==
This marine species occurs off the Tuamotu Archipelago.
