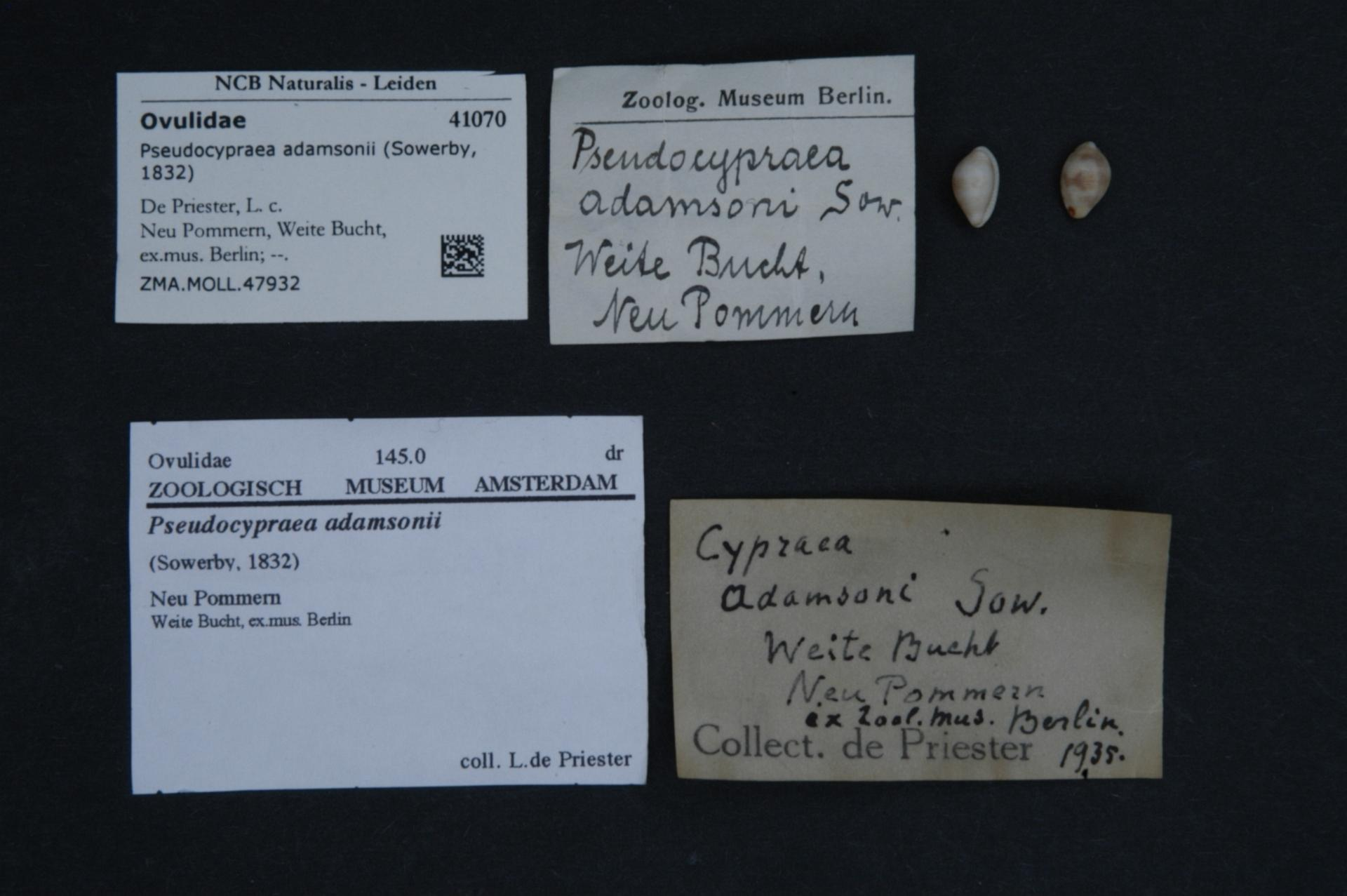
- Pseudocypraea adamsonii

Scientific classification
- Kingdom: Animalia
- Phylum: Mollusca
- Class: Gastropoda
- Subclass: Caenogastropoda
- Order: Littorinimorpha
- Family: Ovulidae
- Subfamily: Pediculariinae
- Genus: Pseudocypraea; Schilder, 1927

= Pseudocypraea =

Genus of gastropods

Pseudocypraea is a genus of sea snails, marine gastropod mollusks in the family Ovulidae, one of the families of cowry allies.

== Species ==
Species within the genus Pseudocypraea include:

- Pseudocypraea adamsonii (Sowerby I, 1832)
- Pseudocypraea alexhuberti Lorenz, 2006
- Pseudocypraea exquisita Petuch, 1979
