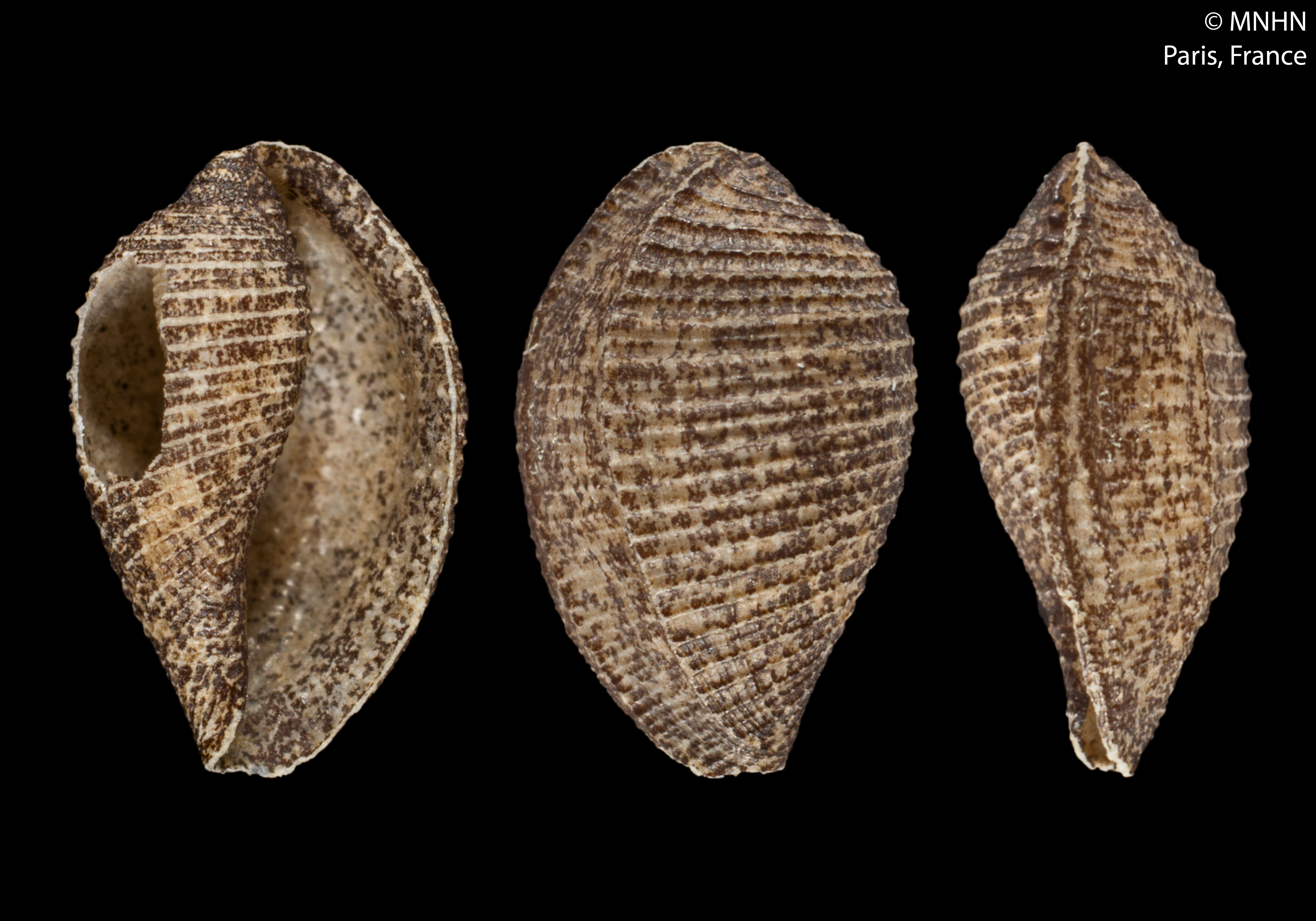
- Shell of Pedicypraedia atlantica (holotype at MNHN? Paris)

Scientific classification
- Kingdom: Animalia
- Phylum: Mollusca
- Class: Gastropoda
- Subclass: Caenogastropoda
- Order: Littorinimorpha
- Family: Ovulidae
- Genus: Pedicypraedia
- Species: P. atlantica

Binomial name
- Pedicypraedia atlantica Lorenz, 2009

= Pedicypraedia atlantica =

Species of gastropod

Pedicypraedia atlantica is a species of sea snail, a marine gastropod mollusk in the family Ovulidae, one of the families of cowry allies.

== Description ==
The length of the shell attains 5.3 mm.

== Distribution ==
This species occurs on the Hyères Seamount, Northeast Atlantic Ocean.
