= Pseudocypraea exquisita =

Scientific classification
- Kingdom: Animalia
- Phylum: Mollusca
- Class: Gastropoda
- Subclass: Caenogastropoda
- Order: Littorinimorpha
- Family: Ovulidae
- Genus: Pseudocypraea
- Species: P. exquisita

Binomial name
- Pseudocypraea exquisita Petuch, 1979

Species of gastropod

Pseudocypraea exquisita is a species of sea snail, a marine gastropod mollusk in the family Ovulidae, one of the families of cowry allies.

== Description ==
Original description: (Shell) "Thin, small, ovately pyriform; dorsum humped; body whorl with numerous fine, evenly spaced spiral threads; outer lip thickened, smooth, shiny; anterior and posterior terminals well produced, prominent; aperture narrow; columella and base smooth and polished; outer lip with 20 well developed teeth; columella with 24 fine teeth; posterior 5 labial teeth more developed than the others, projecting beyond lip margin; color pale tan with large, irregular patches of wine-red; base white with 2 pale red bands."

== Distribution ==
Locus typicus: "250 metres depth, off Panglao, Bohol Isl., Philippines."
