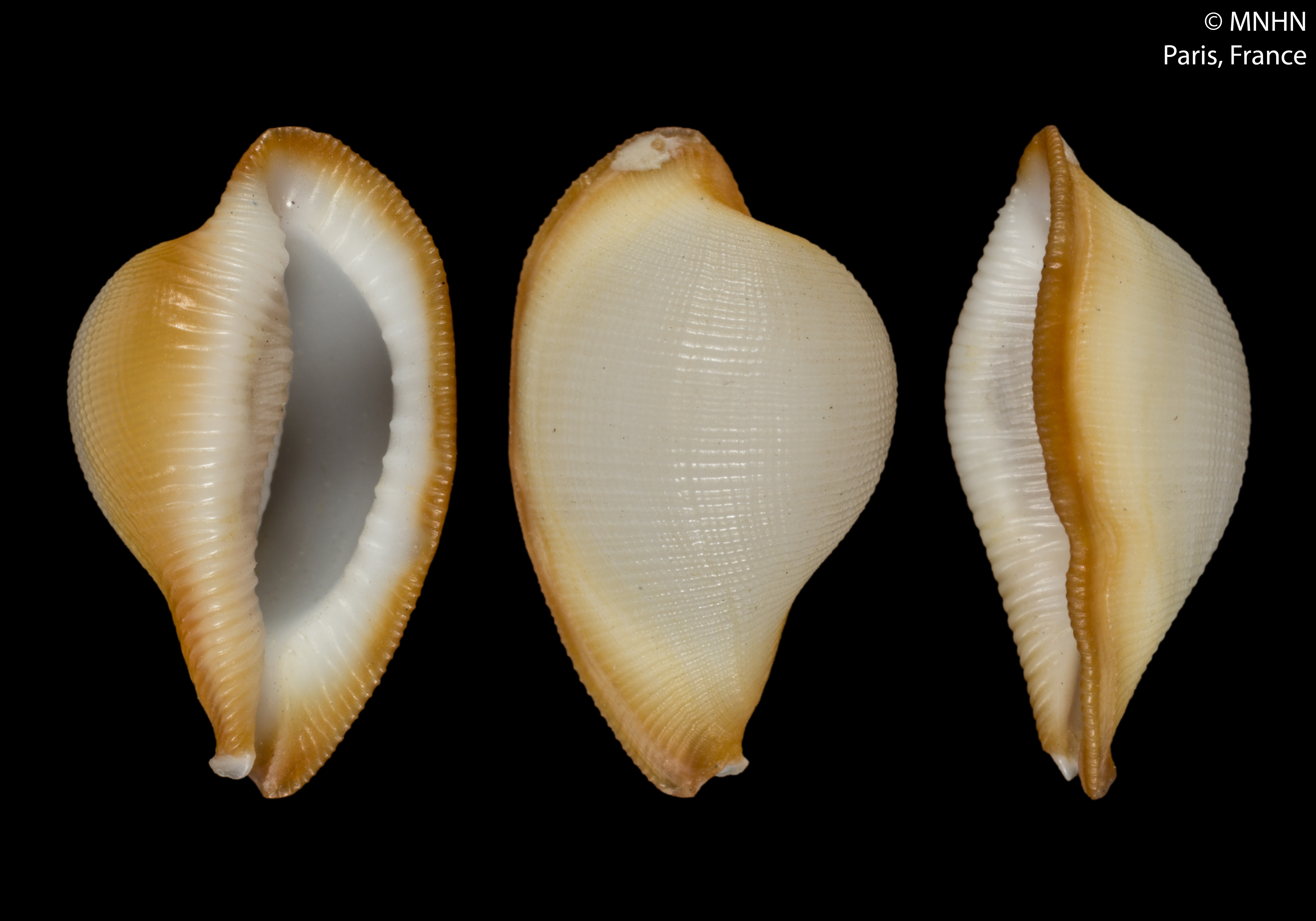
- Shell of Lunovula superstes (holotype at MNHN, Paris)

Scientific classification
- Kingdom: Animalia
- Phylum: Mollusca
- Class: Gastropoda
- Subclass: Caenogastropoda
- Order: Littorinimorpha
- Family: Ovulidae
- Genus: Lunovula
- Species: L. superstes

Binomial name
- Lunovula superstes (Dolin, 1991)

Synonyms
- Cypraeopsis superstes Dolin, 1991; Lunovula venusta Tsuchida & Kurozumi, 1999<

= Lunovula superstes =

Species of gastropod

Lunovula superstes is a species of sea snail, a marine gastropod mollusk in the family Ovulidae, one of the families of cowry allies.

== Description ==
The length of the shell reaches 11.7 mm.

== Distribution ==
This marine species occurs off New Caledonia.
