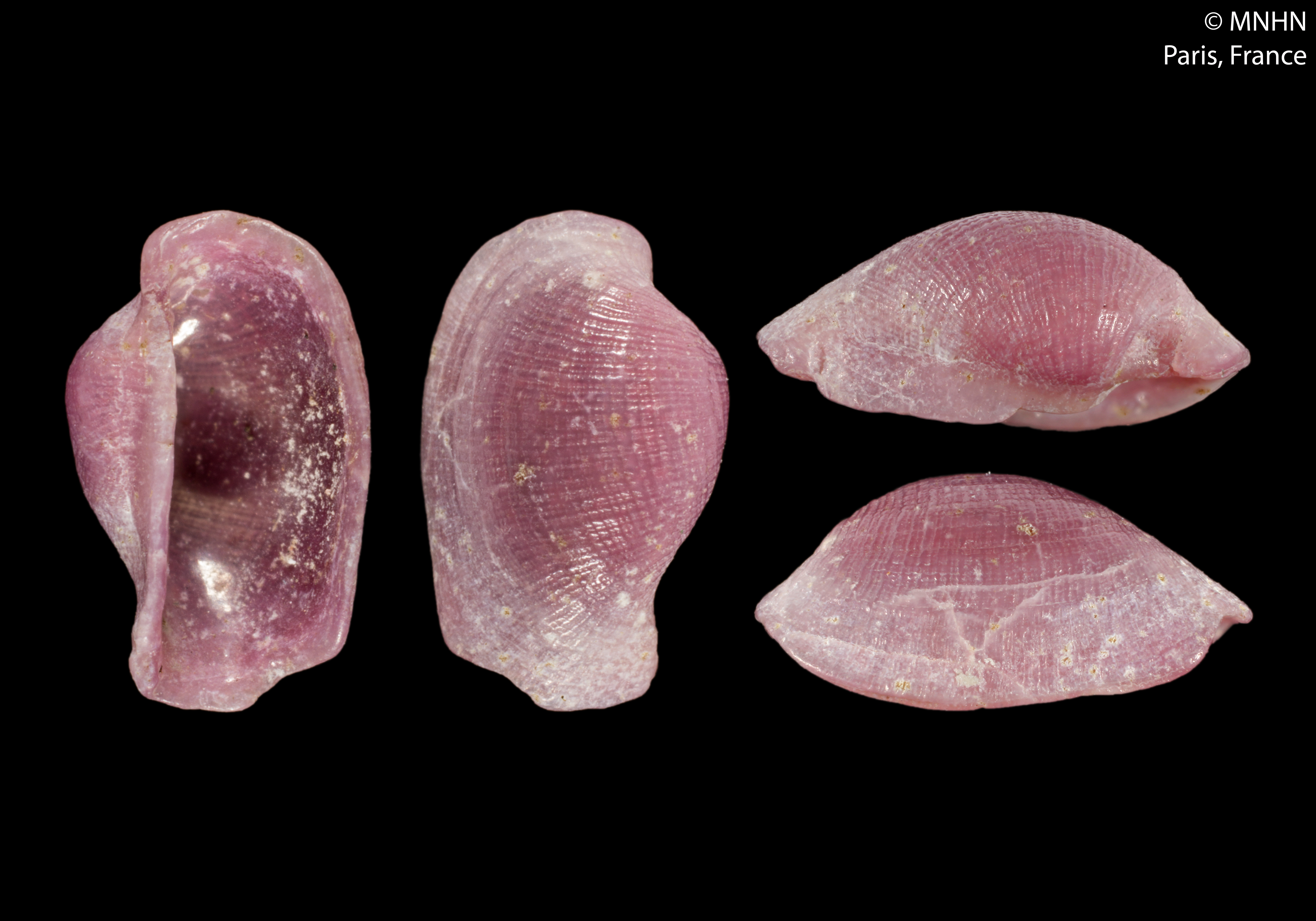
- Shell of Pedicularia elegantissima (specimen at MNHN, Paris)

Scientific classification
- Kingdom: Animalia
- Phylum: Mollusca
- Class: Gastropoda
- Subclass: Caenogastropoda
- Order: Littorinimorpha
- Family: Ovulidae
- Genus: Pedicularia
- Species: P. elegantissima

Binomial name
- Pedicularia elegantissima Deshayes, 1863

= Pedicularia elegantissima =

Species of gastropod

Pedicularia elegantissima is a species of sea snail, a marine gastropod mollusk in the family Ovulidae, one of the families of cowry allies.

== Distribution ==
This marine species occurs off Réunion.
