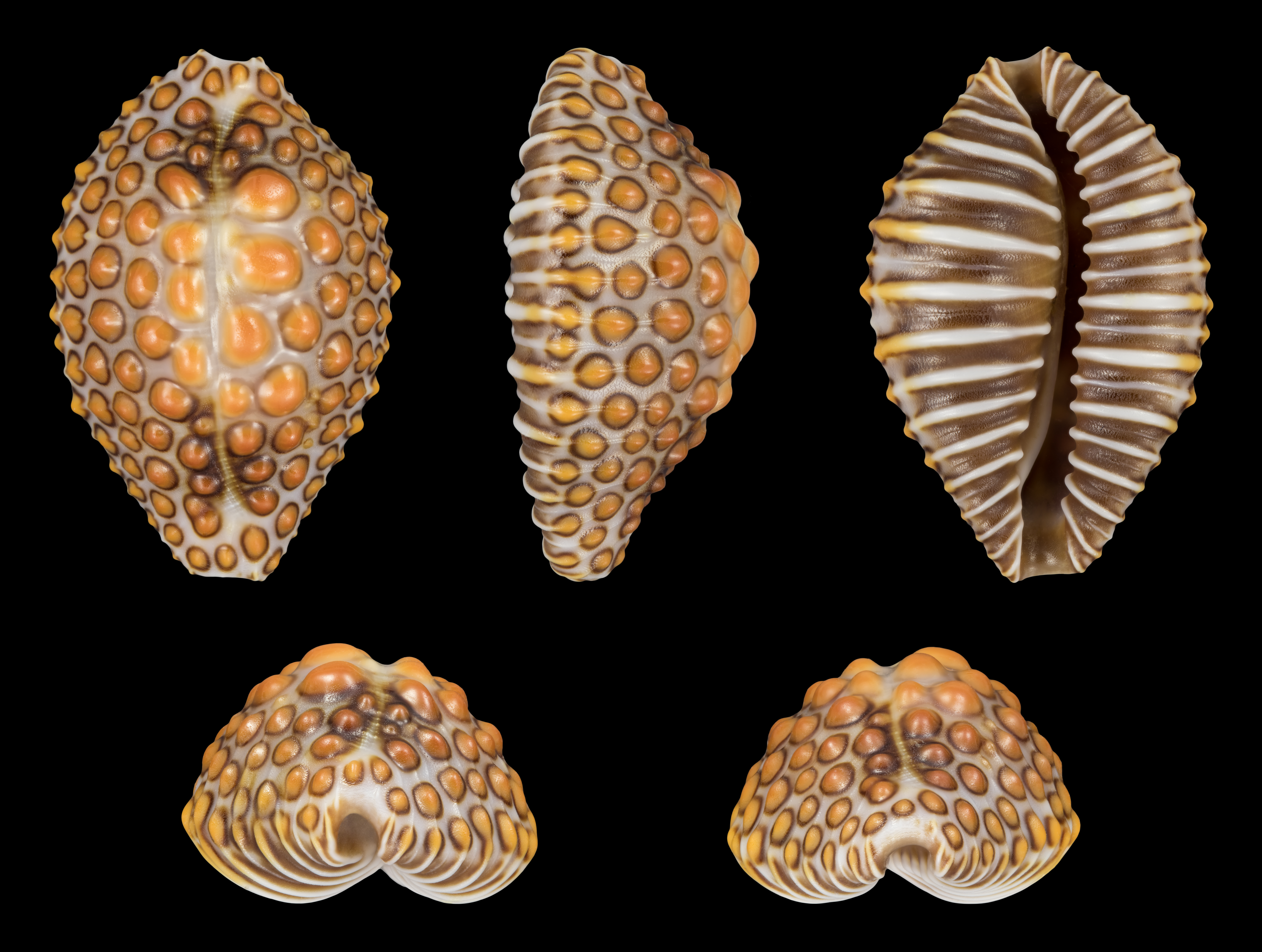
- A shell of Jenneria pustulata

Scientific classification
- Kingdom: Animalia
- Phylum: Mollusca
- Class: Gastropoda
- Subclass: Caenogastropoda
- Order: Littorinimorpha
- Family: Ovulidae
- Genus: Jenneria
- Species: J. pustulata

Binomial name
- Jenneria pustulata (Lightfoot, 1786)

Synonyms
- Jenneria pustulata var. bimaculata Coen, 1949; Jenneria pustulata var. pumilio Coen, 1949

= Jenneria pustulata =

Species of gastropod

Jenneria pustulata, common name the Jenner's cowry or pustulated cowry, is a species of small sea snail, a marine gastropod mollusk in the family Ovulidae, one of the families of cowry allies.

== Description ==
The shells of this common species reach on average 15–27 millimetres (0.59–1.06 in) in length. The shape is usually spindle-like or oval. The dorsum surface is decorated with numerous brilliant orange-red bumps or pustules (hence the Latin name pustulata) surrounded by a dark ring. The basic color of the dorsal surface is grey, beige or brown. The fine labial teeth are prominent, their color is white or pale brown, and they cross the entire base, with dark brown spaces in between. In the living animals the mantle is greyish, with long tree-shaped sensorial papillae.

== Distribution ==
This species occurs in California, the Gulf of California in Western Mexico, Nicaragua, West Panama, Ecuador, Peru Costa Rica and the Galapagos.

== Habitat ==
These sea snails live in tropical to temperate waters at low tide to subtidal levels, and are usually found on coral reef or rocks. They feed by night on stony corals (mainly Pocillopora species in the order Scleractinia), and rest during the day.

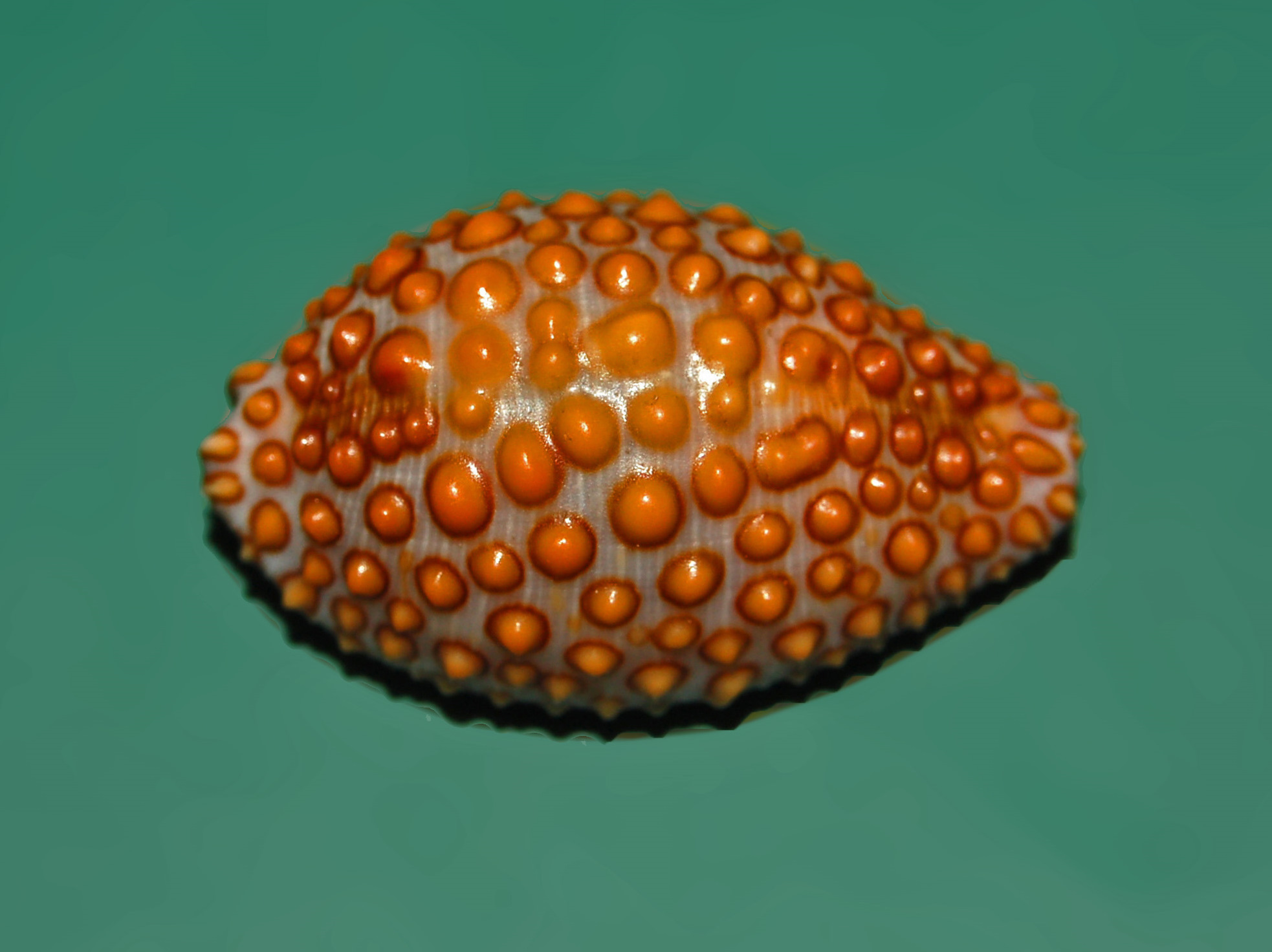
A shell of Jenneria pustulata, dorsal view, anterior end towards the right

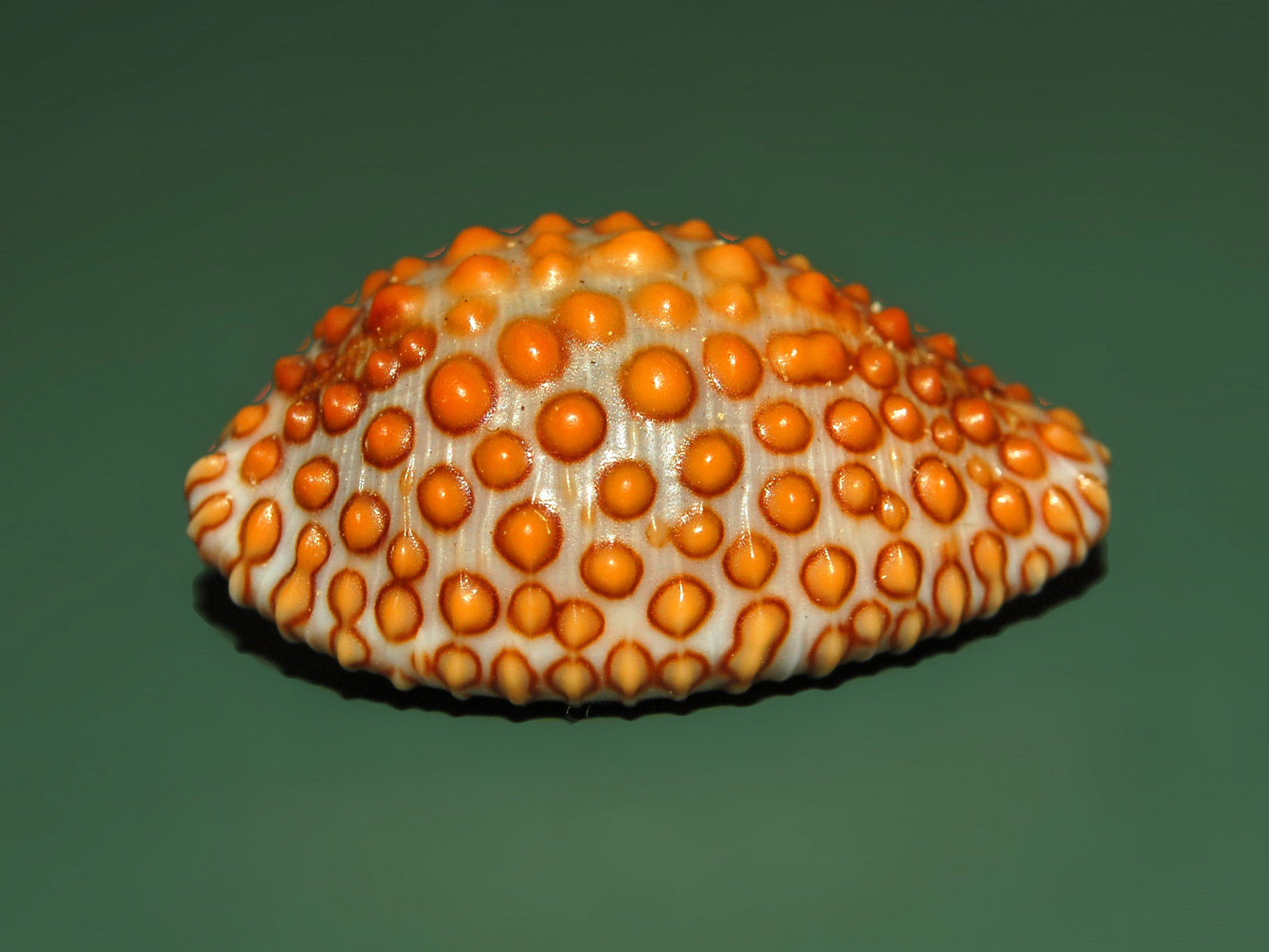
A shell of Jenneria pustulata, lateral view, anterior end towards the right

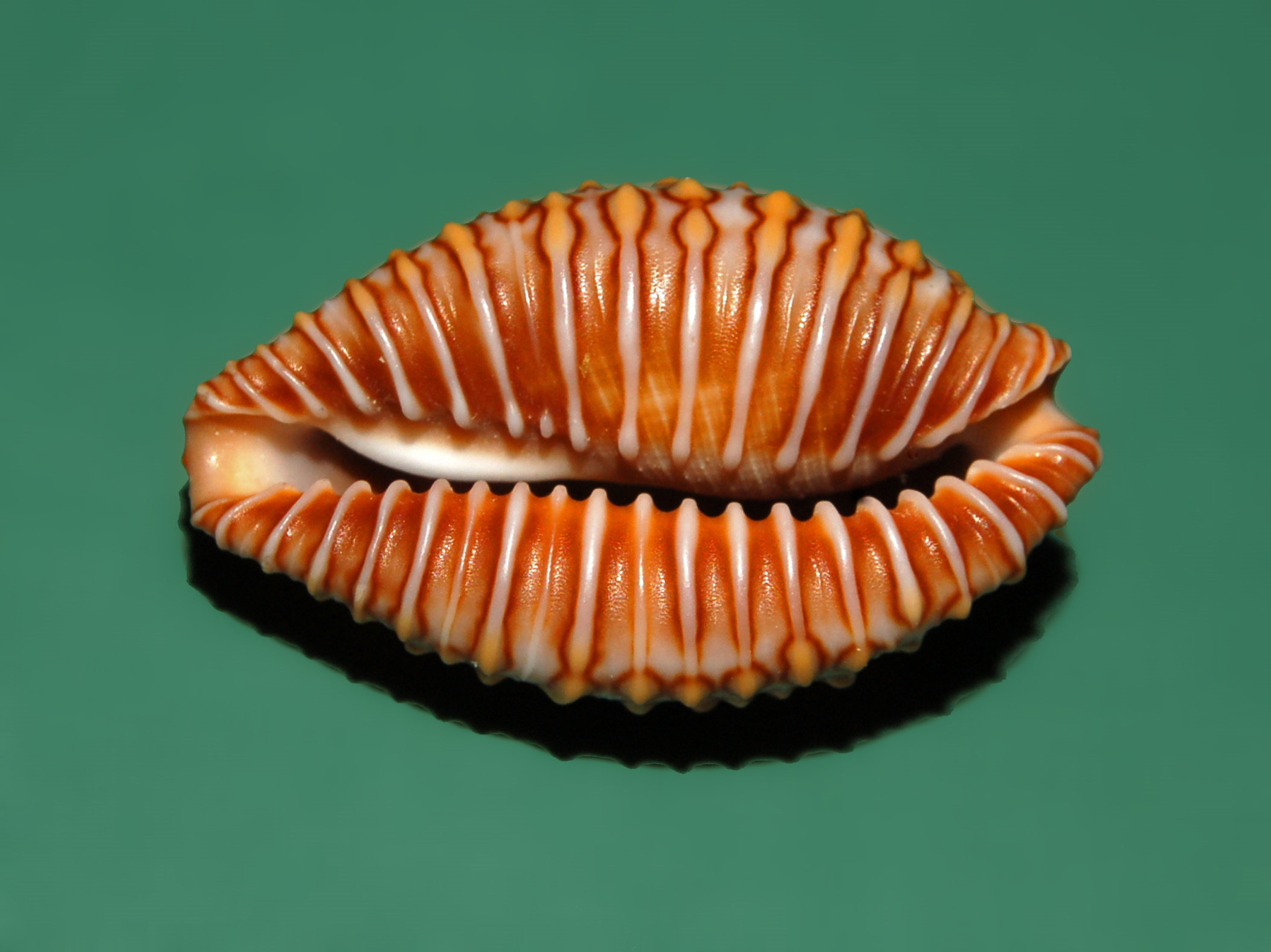
A shell of Jenneria pustulata, ventral view, anterior end towards the left

== Importance ==
This snail has been demonstrated to have significant effects on coral mortality on some Pacific reefs. High predation by this corallivore gastropod was observed in July 2011 at a reef in the northern Gulf of California. Porites panamensis corals were infested by 15 to 40 sea snails per colony. This sea snail is nocturnally active and hides during the day (Glynn, 1985), but during the immersions, individuals were always on the top of the coral colonies, moving and feeding at midday, as Paz-García and colleagues found. These observations indicate a change in the daily pattern of movement and feeding of this snail in the reef. Despite high density of J. pustulata on the reef, no soft corals were observed to have been damaged by the sea snail, only stony corals were infested.
