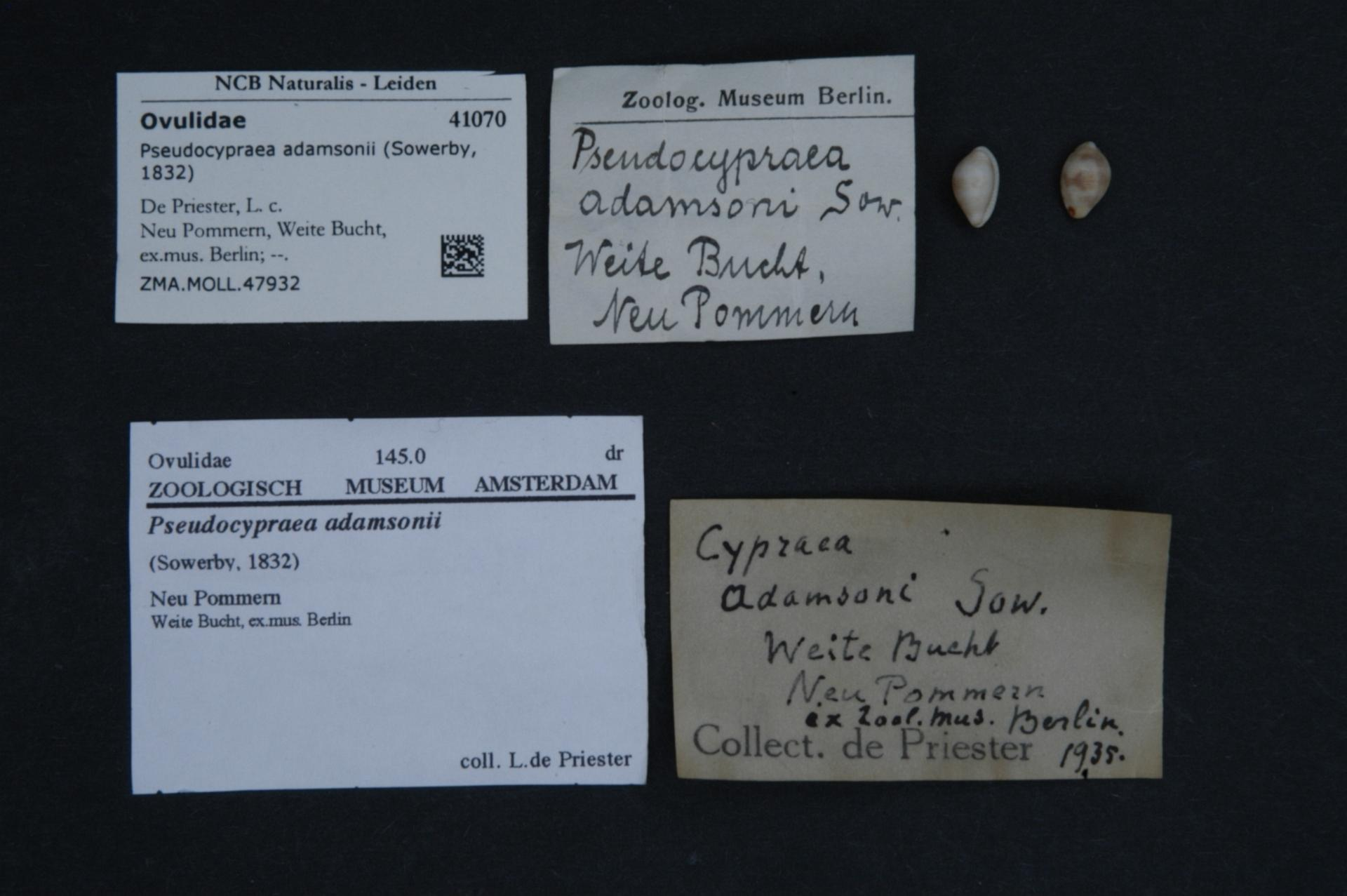

Scientific classification
- Kingdom: Animalia
- Phylum: Mollusca
- Class: Gastropoda
- Subclass: Caenogastropoda
- Order: Littorinimorpha
- Family: Ovulidae
- Genus: Pseudocypraea
- Species: P. adamsonii

Binomial name
- Pseudocypraea adamsonii (Sowerby I, 1832)

Synonyms
- Cypraea adansoni Fischer, 1884; Cypraea adansoniana Stoliczka, 1868

= Pseudocypraea adamsonii =

Species of gastropod

Pseudocypraea adamsonii is a species of sea snail, a marine gastropod mollusk in the family Ovulidae, one of the families of cowry allies. The epithet adamsonii commemorates John Adamson.
