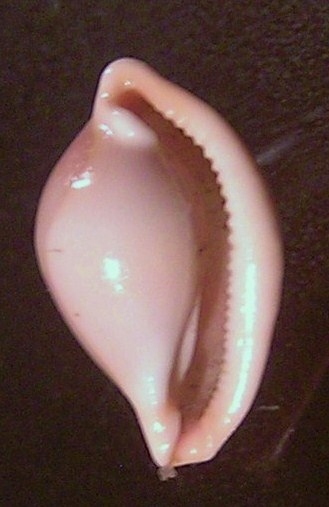
- shell of Pseudosimnia carnea

Scientific classification
- Kingdom: Animalia
- Phylum: Mollusca
- Class: Gastropoda
- Subclass: Caenogastropoda
- Order: Littorinimorpha
- Superfamily: Cypraeoidea
- Family: Ovulidae
- Genus: Pseudosimnia; Schilder, 1927

Type species
- Bulla carnea Poiret, 1789

Synonyms
- Aperiovula Cate, 1973; Primovula (Pseudosimnia) Schilder, 1927 (superseded combination); Pseudosimnia (Aperiovula) C. N. Cate, 1973· accepted, alternate representation

= Pseudosimnia =

Genus of gastropods

Pseudosimnia is a genus of sea snails, marine gastropod mollusks in the subfamily Eocypraeinae of the family Ovulidae.

== Species ==
Species within the genus Pseudosimnia include:

- Pseudosimnia adriatica (Sowerby I, 1828)
- Pseudosimnia alisonae Lorenz & Rosenberg, 2020
- Pseudosimnia angusta Celzard, 2017
- Pseudosimnia carnea (Poiret, 1789)
- Pseudosimnia diaphana (Liltved, 1987)
- Pseudosimnia flava Fehse, 2003
- Pseudosimnia jeanae (Cate, 1973)
- Pseudosimnia juanjosensii (Perez & Gomez, 1987)
- Pseudosimnia lacrima Simone & Cunha, 2012
- Pseudosimnia minima (Talavera, 1975)
- Pseudosimnia nudelmani Lorenz & Fehse, 2009
- Pseudosimnia pyrulina (A. Adams, 1854)
- Pseudosimnia shikamai (Cate, 1973)
- Pseudosimnia vanhyningi (M. Smith, 1940)
- Pseudosimnia wieseorum Lorenz, 1985

Species brought into synonymy

- Subgenus Pseudosimnia (Diminovula) Iredale, 1930: synonym of Diminovula Iredale, 1930
- Pseudosimnia (Diminovula) fruticum (Reeve, 1865): synonym of Prionovolva brevis (Sowerby I, 1828)
- Pseudosimnia adriatica Schilder, 1941: synonym of Pseudosimnia adriatica (Sowerby I, 1828)
- Pseudosimnia alabaster (Reeve, 1865): synonym of Diminovula alabaster (Reeve, 1865)
- Pseudosimnia aurantiomacula Cate & Azuma, 1973: synonym of Diminovula aurantiomacula (Cate & Azuma, 1973)
- Pseudosimnia bilineata Bozzetti, 2009: synonym of Diminovula bilineata (Bozzetti, 2009) (original combination)
- Pseudosimnia caledonica (Crosse, 1872): synonym of Diminovula caledonica (Crosse, 1872)
- Pseudosimnia coroniola Cate, 1973: synonym of Diminovula coroniola (Cate, 1973)
- Pseudosimnia culmen Cate, 1973: synonym of Diminovula culmen (Cate, 1973)
- Pseudosimnia emilyreidae Cate, 1973: synonym of Diminovula kosugei (Cate, 1973)
- Pseudosimnia filia Azuma, 1974: synonym of Primovula rosewateri (Cate, 1973)
- Pseudosimnia florida Kuroda, 1958: synonym of Primovula roseomaculata (Schepman, 1909)
- Pseudosimnia fulguris Azuma & Cate, 1971: synonym of Primovula fulguris (Azuma & Cate, 1971)
- Pseudosimnia incisa Azuma & Cate, 1971: synonym of Diminovula incisa Azuma & Cate, 1971
- Pseudosimnia kandai Cate & Azuma in Cate, 1973: synonym of Testudovolva nipponensis (Pilsbry, 1913)
- Pseudosimnia marginata Sowerby I, 1828: synonym of Margovula marginata (Sowerby I, 1828)
- Pseudosimnia nubila Cate & Azuma in Cate, 1973: synonym of Diminovula whitworthi Cate, 1973
- Pseudosimnia perilla Cate, 1973: synonym of Diminovula dautzenbergi (Schilder, 1931)
- Pseudosimnia pyrifera Cate, 1973: synonym of Pseudosimnia vanhyningi (M. Smith, 1940)
- Pseudosimnia pyriformis Schilder, 1941: synonym of Diminovula alabaster (Reeve, 1865)
- Pseudosimnia pyriformis Kuroda, 1958: synonym of Diminovula alabaster (Reeve, 1865)
- Pseudosimnia sphoni Cate, 1973: synonym of Pseudosimnia vanhyningi (M. Smith, 1940)
- Pseudosimnia striola Cate, 1973: synonym of Diminovula dautzenbergi (Schilder, 1931)
- Pseudosimnia translineata Cate, 1973: synonym of Margovula translineata (Cate, 1973)
- Pseudosimnia verepunctata Iredale, 1930: synonym of Diminovula alabaster (Reeve, 1865)
- Pseudosimnia whitworthi Cate, 1973: synonym of Diminovula whitworthi Cate, 1973
