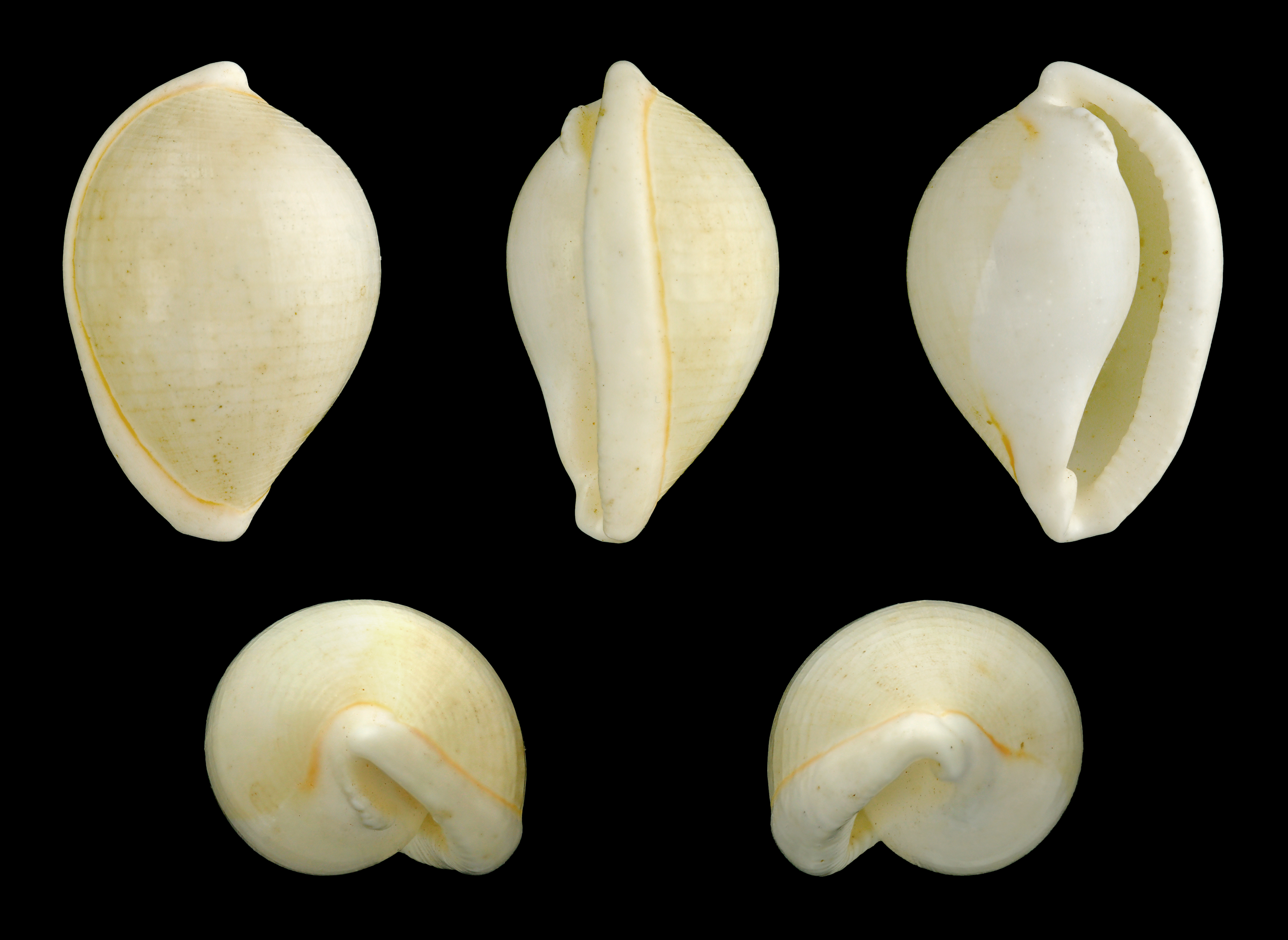

Scientific classification
- Kingdom: Animalia
- Phylum: Mollusca
- Class: Gastropoda
- Subclass: Caenogastropoda
- Order: Littorinimorpha
- Family: Ovulidae
- Genus: Margovula; Iredale, 1935

Synonyms
- Lacrima Cate, 1973

= Margovula =

Genus of gastropods

Margovula is a genus of sea snails, marine gastropod mollusks in the family Ovulidae.

== Species ==
Species within the genus Margovula include:

- Margovula anulata (Fehse, 2001)
- Margovula bimaculata (A. Adams, 1854)
- Margovula crawfordcatei Lorenz & Fehse, 2009
- Margovula lacrima (Cate, 1973)
- Margovula marginata (Sowerby I, 1828)
- Margovula pyriformis (Sowerby I, 1828)
- Margovula schilderorum Cate, 1973
- Margovula somaliensis (Fehse, 2001)
- Margovula tinctilis (Cate, 1973)
- Margovula translineata (Cate, 1973)

Species broughtinto synonymy

- Margovula aboriginea C. N. Cate, 1973: synonym of Diminovula aboriginea (C. N. Cate, 1973)
- Margovula changi Ma, 1997: synonym of Diminovula margarita (G. B. Sowerby I, 1828)
- Margovula kosugei C. N. Cate, 1973: synonym of Diminovula kosugei (C. N. Cate, 1973)
- Margovula pyrulina (A. Adams, 1854): synonym of Pseudosimnia pyrulina (A. Adams, 1855)
