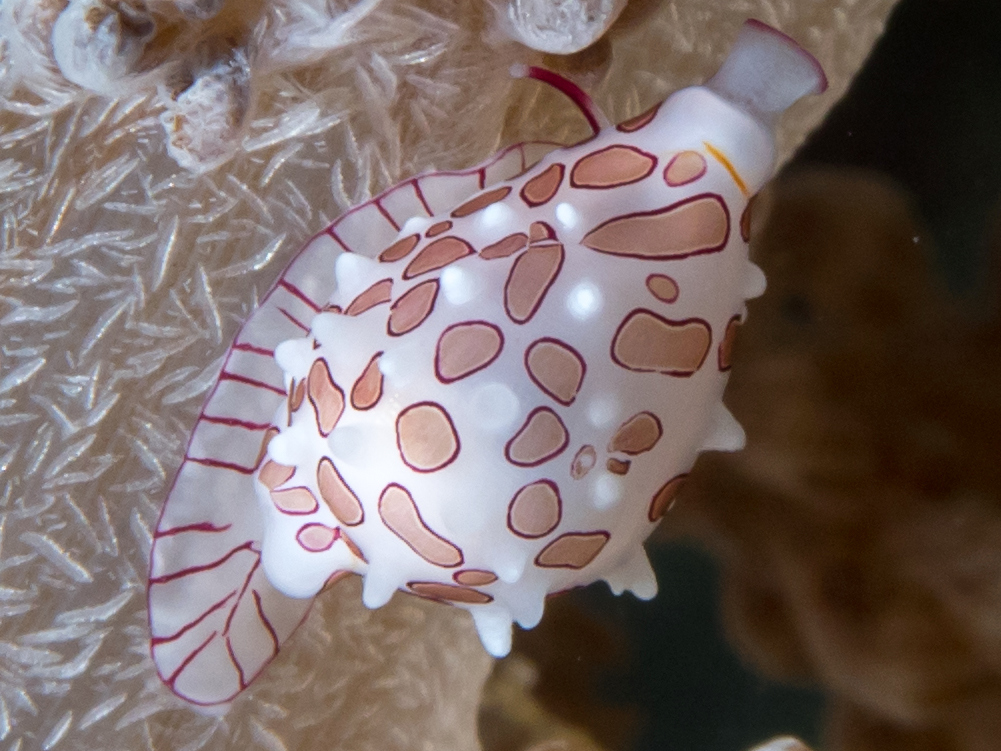
- Diminovula margarita

Scientific classification
- Kingdom: Animalia
- Phylum: Mollusca
- Class: Gastropoda
- Subclass: Caenogastropoda
- Order: Littorinimorpha
- Family: Ovulidae
- Genus: Diminovula; Iredale, 1930

Type species
- Diminovula verepunctata Iredale, 1930

Synonyms
- Adamantia Cate, 1973; Inflatovula Cate, 1973; Primovula (Adamantia) C. N. Cate, 1973; Pseudosimnia (Diminovula) Iredale, 1930

= Diminovula =

Genus of gastropods

Diminovula is a genus of sea snails, marine gastropod mollusks in the subfamily Eocypraeinae of the family Ovulidae.

== Species ==
Species within the genus Diminovula include:

- Diminovula aboriginea (Cate, 1973)
- Diminovula alabaster (Reeve, 1865)
- Diminovula aurantiomacula Cate & Azuma in Cate, 1973
- Diminovula bilineata (Bozzetti, 2009)
- Diminovula caledonica (Crosse, 1872)
- Diminovula concinna (Sowerby II in A. Adams & Reeve, 1848)
- Diminovula coroniola (Cate, 1973)
- Diminovula culmen (Cate, 1973)
- Diminovula dautzenbergi (Schilder, 1931)
- Diminovula fainzilberi Fehse, 2009
- Diminovula incisa Azuma & Cate, 1971
- Diminovula kosugei (Cate, 1973)
- Diminovula margarita (Sowerby I, 1828)
- Diminovula mozambiquensis Fehse, 2001
- Diminovula nielseni Cate, 1976
- Diminovula punctata (Duclos, 1828)
- Diminovula rosadoi Lorenz & Fehse, 2009
- Diminovula sandrae Lorenz & Fehse, 2011
- Diminovula stigma (Cate, 1978)
- Diminovula whitworthi Cate, 1973

Species brought in synonymy

- Diminovula anulata Fehse, 2001: synonym of Margovula anulata (Fehse, 2001)
- Diminovula cavanaghi Iredale, 1931: synonym of Globovula cavanaghi (Iredale, 1931)
- Diminovula sinensis (G. B. Sowerby III, 1874): synonym of Margovula marginata (G. B. Sowerby I, 1828)
