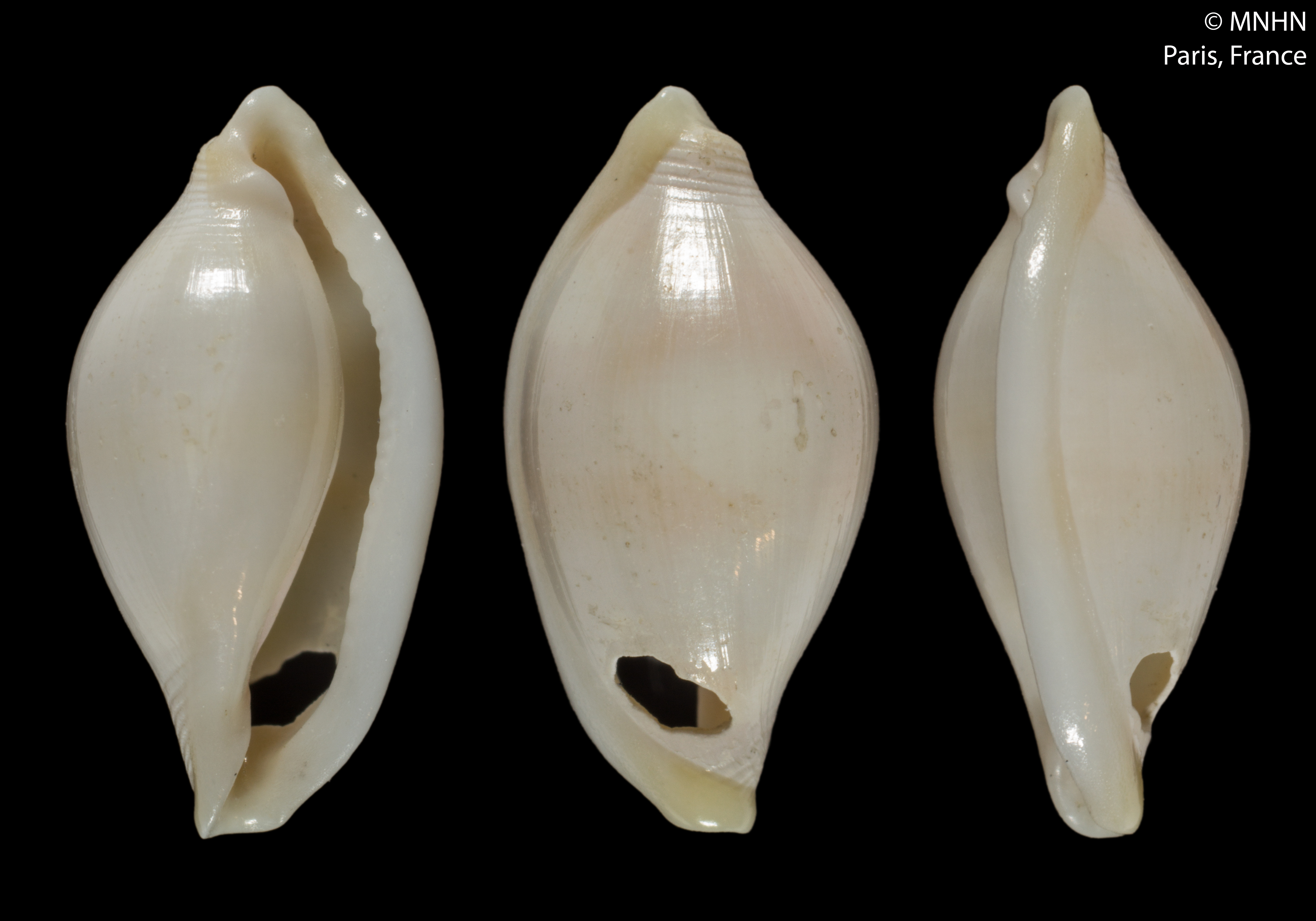
- Shell of Pseudosimnia nudelmani (holotype at MNHN, Paris)

Scientific classification
- Kingdom: Animalia
- Phylum: Mollusca
- Class: Gastropoda
- Subclass: Caenogastropoda
- Order: Littorinimorpha
- Family: Ovulidae
- Genus: Pseudosimnia
- Species: P. nudelmani

Binomial name
- Pseudosimnia nudelmani Lorenz & Fehse, 2009

= Pseudosimnia nudelmani =

Species of gastropod

Pseudosimnia nudelmani is a species of sea snail, a marine gastropod mollusk in the family Ovulidae, the ovulids, cowry allies or false cowries.

== Description ==
The length of the shell attains 8.3 mm.

== Distribution ==
The marine species occurs in the Indian Ocean off Réunion.
