= Diminovula nielseni =

Scientific classification
- Kingdom: Animalia
- Phylum: Mollusca
- Class: Gastropoda
- Subclass: Caenogastropoda
- Order: Littorinimorpha
- Family: Ovulidae
- Genus: Diminovula
- Species: D. nielseni

Binomial name
- Diminovula nielseni Cate, 1976

Species of gastropod

Diminovula nielseni is a species of sea snail in the family Ovulidae, the ovulids, cowry allies or false cowries.
