= Diminovula mozambiquensis =

Scientific classification
- Kingdom: Animalia
- Phylum: Mollusca
- Class: Gastropoda
- Subclass: Caenogastropoda
- Order: Littorinimorpha
- Family: Ovulidae
- Genus: Diminovula
- Species: D. mozambiquensis

Binomial name
- Diminovula mozambiquensis Fehse, 2001

Species of gastropod

Diminovula mozambiquensis is a species of sea snails, a marine gastropod mollusc in the family Ovulidae, the ovulids, cowry allies or false cowries.
