= Pseudosimnia wieseorum =

Scientific classification
- Kingdom: Animalia
- Phylum: Mollusca
- Class: Gastropoda
- Subclass: Caenogastropoda
- Order: Littorinimorpha
- Family: Ovulidae
- Genus: Pseudosimnia
- Species: P. wieseorum

Binomial name
- Pseudosimnia wieseorum Lorenz, 1985

Species of gastropod

Pseudosimnia wieseorum is a species of sea snail, a marine gastropod mollusk in the family Ovulidae, the ovulids, cowry allies or false cowries.

== Description ==
Original description: "Shell light and fragile, some have a slightly callous base. The shape is pyriform and varies little, with tapered extremes and a slightly margined dorsum. The dorsum is finely striated transversally, especially towards the extremities. The internal part of the labrum has 17 to 25 sharp denticles. The terminal plica on the columellar side shows slight traces of 2-4 denticles, while the rest of the columella is smooth. The fossula is well pronounced in adult specimens and forms a jutting callous line along the sulcus. The aperture bends sharply to the left. The base is white but may become pale yellow towards the margins which are bright yellow, especially the external one. The dorsum is white, with two indistinct pale purple zones towards the extremities and is distinctly framed by a bright orange band on the labial side. This band seems almost to divide the dorsum from the labial margin and gives the shell a most delicate appearance. The height of the shell may vary between 10 and 16.5 mm., while the width is, on average, 60% of the height. Infraspecific variability is very little, the above-described characteristics are found in all specimens, except the yellow colouring at the base, which can also be completely white. The yellow band, on the other hand, is a constant specific feature and is always complete throughout the whole length of the external lip, from one extremity to the other. It may also be present towards the extremities of the columellar side but it is always interrupted on the columellar margin. The band may become fainter towards the center of the external lip only in subadult specimens."

The size of the shell varies between 12 mm and 16 mm.

== Type material ==
"The holotype measures 12 x 8 mm. and will be preserved in the Civic Museum of Zoology of Rome collection.
Paratype No. 1(12 x 8 mm.) is in the Mrs. Kety Nicolay's collection.
Ten other specimens have been chosen as paratypes to distribute to various Museums."

== Distribution ==
Locus typicus: "At a depth of 300 m, about 20 miles South of Cape Ras Hafun, Somalia."

This species occurs in the Red Sea and in the Indian Ocean off Somalia.
