= Margovula bimaculata =

Scientific classification
- Kingdom: Animalia
- Phylum: Mollusca
- Class: Gastropoda
- Subclass: Caenogastropoda
- Order: Littorinimorpha
- Family: Ovulidae
- Genus: Margovula
- Species: M. bimaculata

Binomial name
- Margovula bimaculata (A. Adams, 1854)

Synonyms
- Amphiperas bimaculata A. Adams, 1854

Species of gastropod

Margovula bimaculata is a species of sea snail, a marine gastropod mollusk in the family Ovulidae, the ovulids, cowry allies or false cowries.
