= Margovula lacrima =

Scientific classification
- Kingdom: Animalia
- Phylum: Mollusca
- Class: Gastropoda
- Subclass: Caenogastropoda
- Order: Littorinimorpha
- Family: Ovulidae
- Genus: Margovula; Cate, 1973
- Species: M. lacrima

Binomial name
- Margovula lacrima (Cate, 1973)

Synonyms
- Lacrima lacrima Cate, 1973; Lacrima simulans Cate, 1973

Species of gastropod

Margovula lacrima is a species of sea snail, a marine gastropod mollusk in the family Ovulidae, the ovulids, cowry allies or false cowries.
