= Margovula pyriformis =

Scientific classification
- Kingdom: Animalia
- Phylum: Mollusca
- Class: Gastropoda
- Subclass: Caenogastropoda
- Order: Littorinimorpha
- Family: Ovulidae
- Genus: Margovula
- Species: M. pyriformis

Binomial name
- Margovula pyriformis (Sowerby I, 1828)

Synonyms
- Amphiperas pyrulinus A. Adams, 1854; Ovulum pyriformis Sowerby I, 1828

Species of gastropod

Margovula pyriformis is a species of sea snail, a marine gastropod mollusk in the family Ovulidae, the ovulids, cowry allies or false cowries.
