= Margovula crawfordcatei =

Scientific classification
- Kingdom: Animalia
- Phylum: Mollusca
- Class: Gastropoda
- Subclass: Caenogastropoda
- Order: Littorinimorpha
- Family: Ovulidae
- Genus: Margovula
- Species: M. crawfordcatei

Binomial name
- Margovula crawfordcatei Lorenz & Fehse, 2009

Species of gastropod

Margovula crawfordcatei is a species of sea snail, a marine gastropod mollusk in the family Ovulidae, the ovulids, cowry allies or false cowries.
