= Margovula somaliensis =

Scientific classification
- Kingdom: Animalia
- Phylum: Mollusca
- Class: Gastropoda
- Subclass: Caenogastropoda
- Order: Littorinimorpha
- Family: Ovulidae
- Genus: Margovula
- Species: M. somaliensis

Binomial name
- Margovula somaliensis (Fehse, 2001)

Synonyms
- Testudovolva somaliensis Fehse, 2001

Species of gastropod

Margovula somaliensis is a species of sea snail, a marine gastropod mollusk in the family Ovulidae, the ovulids, cowry allies or false cowries.
