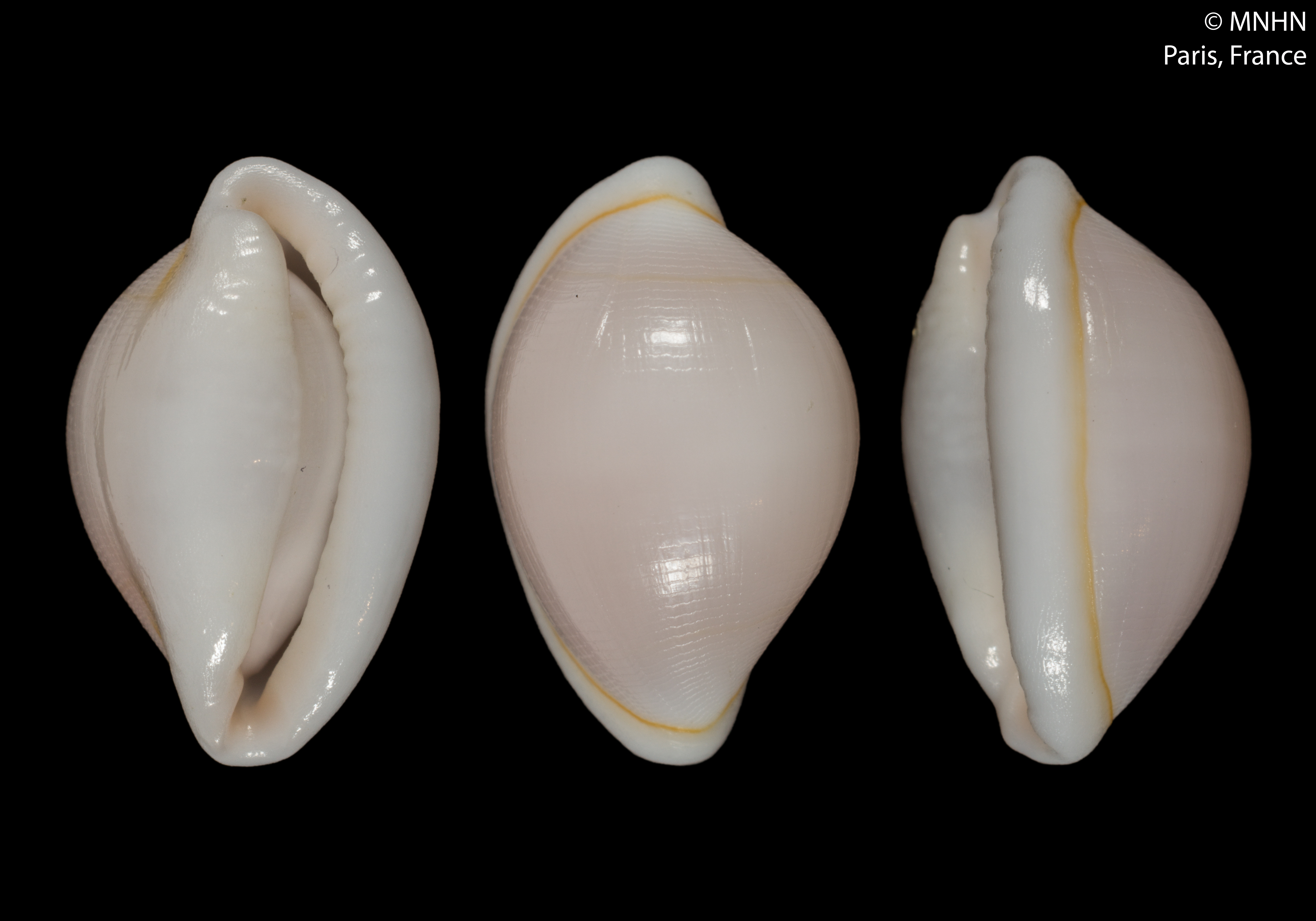
- Shell of Diminovula rosadoi (holotype at MNHN, Paris)

Scientific classification
- Kingdom: Animalia
- Phylum: Mollusca
- Class: Gastropoda
- Subclass: Caenogastropoda
- Order: Littorinimorpha
- Family: Ovulidae
- Genus: Diminovula
- Species: D. rosadoi

Binomial name
- Diminovula rosadoi Lorenz & Fehse, 2009

= Diminovula rosadoi =

Species of gastropod

Diminovula rosadoi is a species of sea snail in the family Ovulidae, the ovulids, cowry allies or false cowries.

== Description ==
The length of the shell attains 8.9 mm.

== Distribution ==
This marine species occurs off Mozambique.
