= Diminovula fainzilberi =

Scientific classification
- Kingdom: Animalia
- Phylum: Mollusca
- Class: Gastropoda
- Subclass: Caenogastropoda
- Order: Littorinimorpha
- Family: Ovulidae
- Genus: Diminovula
- Species: D. fainzilberi

Binomial name
- Diminovula fainzilberi Fehse, 2009

Species of mollusc

Diminovula fainzilberi is species of sea snail in the family Ovulidae, the ovulids, cowry allies or false cowries.
