= Pseudosimnia flava =

Scientific classification
- Kingdom: Animalia
- Phylum: Mollusca
- Class: Gastropoda
- Subclass: Caenogastropoda
- Order: Littorinimorpha
- Family: Ovulidae
- Genus: Pseudosimnia
- Species: P. flava

Binomial name
- Pseudosimnia flava Fehse, 2003

Species of gastropod

Pseudosimnia flava is a species of sea snail, a marine gastropod mollusk in the family Ovulidae, the ovulids, cowry allies or false cowries.
