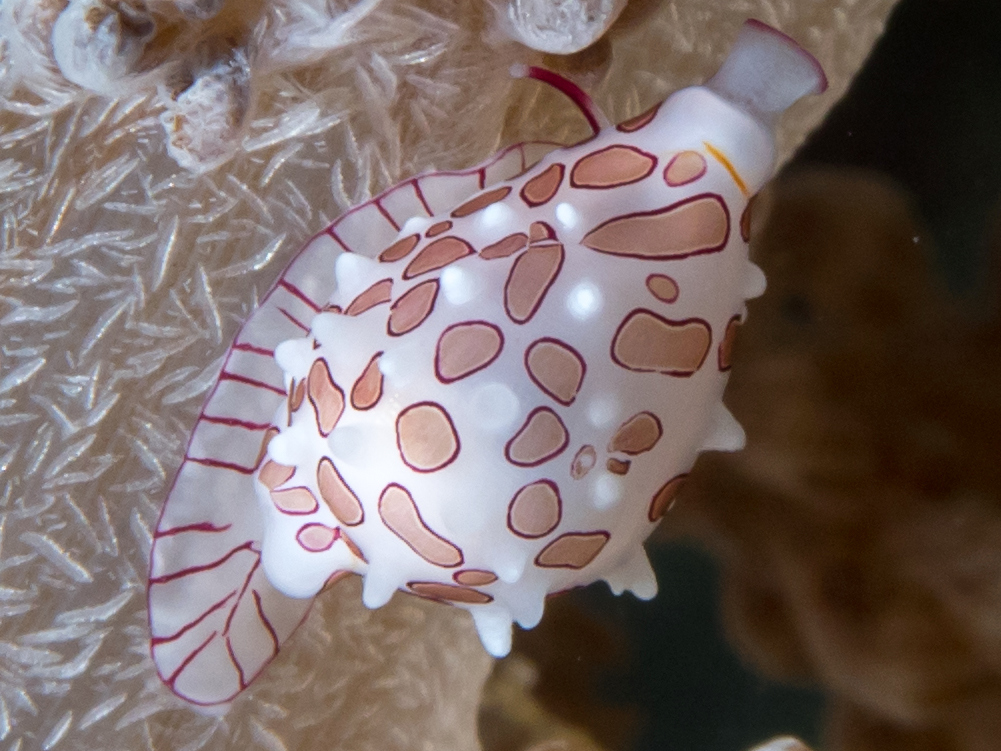

Scientific classification
- Kingdom: Animalia
- Phylum: Mollusca
- Class: Gastropoda
- Subclass: Caenogastropoda
- Order: Littorinimorpha
- Family: Ovulidae
- Genus: Diminovula
- Species: D. margarita

Binomial name
- Diminovula margarita (G.B. Sowerby I, 1828)

Synonyms
- Globovula margarita G.B. Sowerby I, 1828; Margovula changi Ma Xiu-Tong, 1997; Ovula umbilicata G.B. Sowerby II, 1848; Ovulum margarita G.B. Sowerby I, 1828

= Diminovula margarita =

Species of gastropod

Diminovula margarita is a species of sea snail in the family Ovulidae, the ovulids, cowry allies or false cowries.
