= Pseudosimnia pyrulina =

Scientific classification
- Kingdom: Animalia
- Phylum: Mollusca
- Class: Gastropoda
- Subclass: Caenogastropoda
- Order: Littorinimorpha
- Family: Ovulidae
- Genus: Pseudosimnia
- Species: P. pyrulina

Binomial name
- Pseudosimnia pyrulina (A. Adams, 1854)

Synonyms
- Aperiovula albomarginata Cate, 1978; Aperiovula aurora Omi, 2003; Aperiovula yukitai Azuma, 1974; Prionovolva aureomarginata Shikama, 1973

Species of gastropod

Pseudosimnia pyrulina is a species of sea snail, a marine gastropod mollusk in the family Ovulidae, the ovulids, cowry allies or false cowries.
