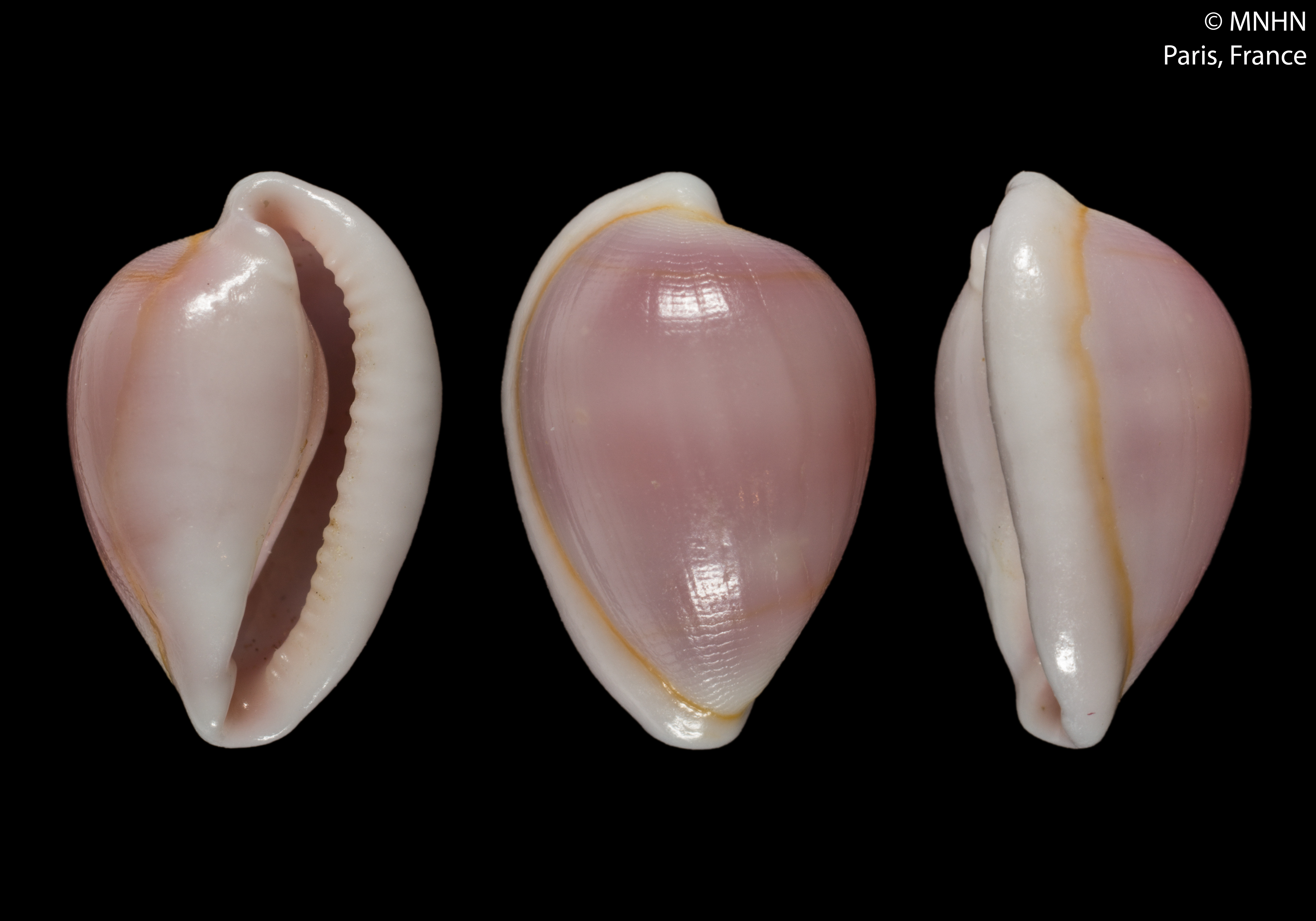
- Shell of Diminovula bilineata (holotype at MNHN, Paris)

Scientific classification
- Kingdom: Animalia
- Phylum: Mollusca
- Class: Gastropoda
- Subclass: Caenogastropoda
- Order: Littorinimorpha
- Family: Ovulidae
- Genus: Diminovula
- Species: D. bilineata

Binomial name
- Diminovula bilineata (Bozzetti, 2009)

Synonyms
- Pseudosimnia bilineata Bozzetti, 2009 (original combination)

= Diminovula bilineata =

Species of gastropod

Diminovula bilineata is a species of sea snail, a marine gastropod mollusk in the family Ovulidae, the ovulids, cowry allies or false cowries.

== Description ==
The length of the shell attains 8.5 mm.

== Distribution ==
This marine species occurs off Madagascar.
