= Diminovula aurantiomacula =

Scientific classification
- Kingdom: Animalia
- Phylum: Mollusca
- Class: Gastropoda
- Subclass: Caenogastropoda
- Order: Littorinimorpha
- Family: Ovulidae
- Genus: Diminovula
- Species: D. aurantiomacula

Binomial name
- Diminovula aurantiomacula Cate & Azuma in Cate, 1973

Synonyms
- Pseudosimnia aurantiomacula Cate & Azuma in Cate, 1973

Species of gastropod

Diminovula aurantiomacula is a species of sea snail in the family Ovulidae, the ovulids, cowry allies or false cowries.
