= Diminovula alabaster =

Scientific classification
- Kingdom: Animalia
- Phylum: Mollusca
- Class: Gastropoda
- Subclass: Caenogastropoda
- Order: Littorinimorpha
- Family: Ovulidae
- Genus: Diminovula
- Species: D. alabaster

Binomial name
- Diminovula alabaster (Reeve, 1865)

Synonyms
- Amphiperas ovoideus H. Adams, 1873; Ovula cristallina Kiener, 1843; Ovulum alabaster Reeve, 1865; Primovula pyriformis Allan, 1956; Pseudosimnia alabaster (Reeve, 1865); Pseudosimnia pyriformis Schilder, 1941; Pseudosimnia pyriformis Kuroda, 1958; Pseudosimnia verepunctata Iredale, 1930

Species of gastropod

Diminovula alabaster is a species of sea snail in the family Ovulidae, the ovulids, cowry allies or false cowries.
