= Diminovula dautzenbergi =

Scientific classification
- Kingdom: Animalia
- Phylum: Mollusca
- Class: Gastropoda
- Subclass: Caenogastropoda
- Order: Littorinimorpha
- Family: Ovulidae
- Genus: Diminovula
- Species: D. dautzenbergi

Binomial name
- Diminovula dautzenbergi (Schilder, 1931)

Synonyms
- Primovula dautzenbergi Schilder, 1931; Pseudosimnia perilla Cate, 1973; Pseudosimnia striola Cate, 1973

Species of gastropod

Diminovula dautzenbergi is a species of sea snail in the family Ovulidae, the ovulids, cowry allies or false cowries.
