= Diminovula aboriginea =

Scientific classification
- Kingdom: Animalia
- Phylum: Mollusca
- Class: Gastropoda
- Subclass: Caenogastropoda
- Order: Littorinimorpha
- Family: Ovulidae
- Genus: Diminovula
- Species: D. aboriginea

Binomial name
- Diminovula aboriginea (Cate, 1973)

Synonyms
- Margovula aboriginea Cate, 1973

Species of gastropod

Diminovula aboriginea is a species of sea snail in the family Ovulidae, the ovulids, cowry allies or false cowries.
