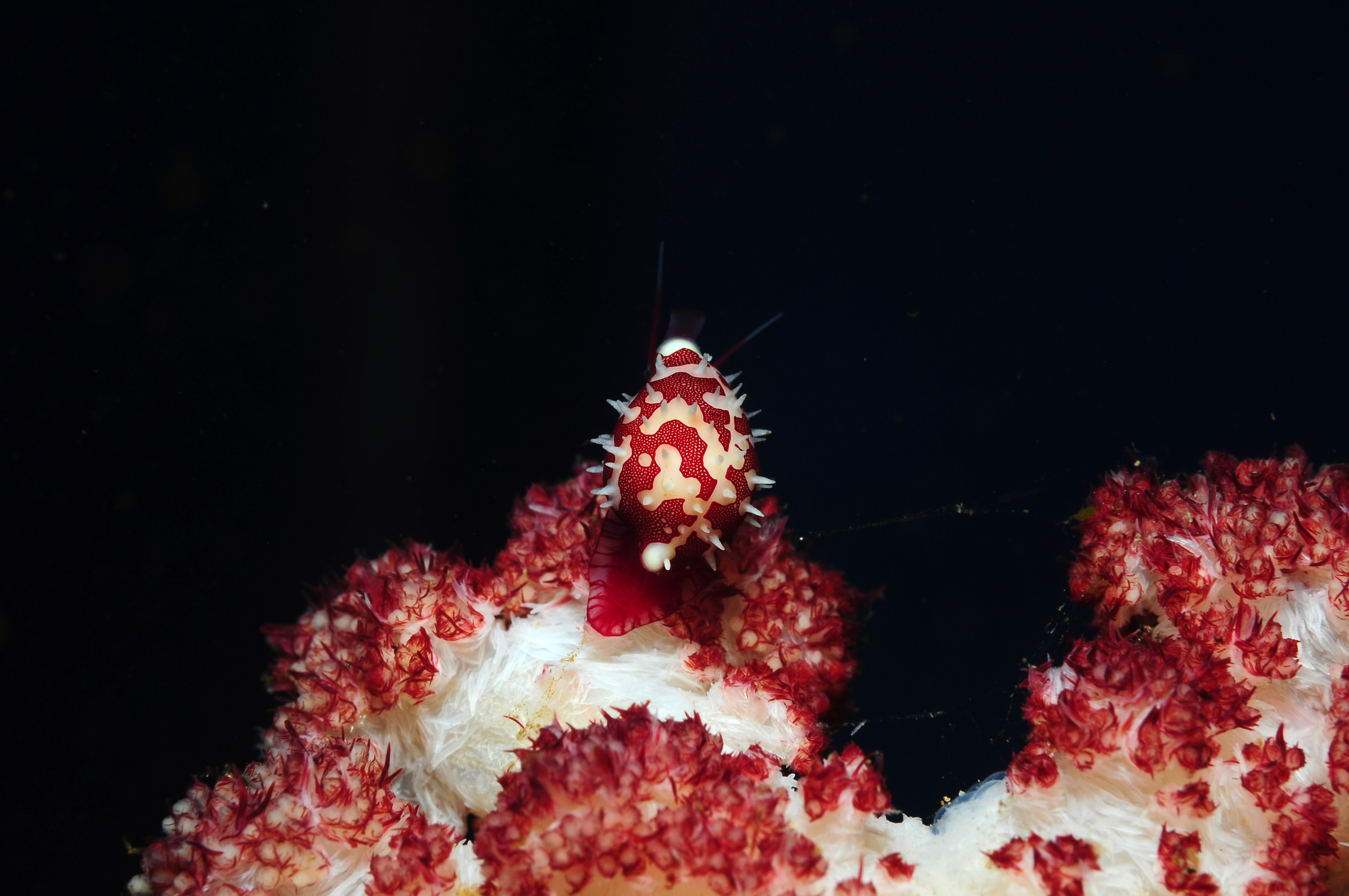
- A false cowry (Diminovula culmen) inhabiting a soft coral (Dendronephthya sp.)

Scientific classification
- Kingdom: Animalia
- Phylum: Mollusca
- Class: Gastropoda
- Subclass: Caenogastropoda
- Order: Littorinimorpha
- Family: Ovulidae
- Genus: Diminovula
- Species: D. culmen

Binomial name
- Diminovula culmen (Cate, 1973)

Synonyms
- Pseudosimnia culmen Cate, 1973

= Diminovula culmen =

Species of gastropod

Diminovula culmen is a species of sea snail in the family Ovulidae, the ovulids, cowry allies or false cowries.

== Distribution ==
This marine species occurs off East Africa and in the Central Pacific.
