= Margovula anulata =

Scientific classification
- Kingdom: Animalia
- Phylum: Mollusca
- Class: Gastropoda
- Subclass: Caenogastropoda
- Order: Littorinimorpha
- Family: Ovulidae
- Genus: Margovula
- Species: M. anulata

Binomial name
- Margovula anulata (Fehse, 2001)

Species of gastropod

Margovula anulata is a species of sea snail, a marine gastropod mollusk in the family Ovulidae, the ovulids, cowry allies or false cowries.

== Description ==
The shell size varies between 8 mm and 22 mm

== Distribution ==
This species is distributed along the Philippines.
