= Diminovula whitworthi =

Scientific classification
- Kingdom: Animalia
- Phylum: Mollusca
- Class: Gastropoda
- Subclass: Caenogastropoda
- Order: Littorinimorpha
- Family: Ovulidae
- Genus: Diminovula
- Species: D. whitworthi

Binomial name
- Diminovula whitworthi Cate, 1973

Synonyms
- Prionovolva brevis Sowerby I, 1828; Pseudosimnia nubila Cate & Azuma in Cate, 1973; Pseudosimnia whitworthi Cate, 1973

Species of gastropod

Diminovula whitworthi is a species of sea snail in the family Ovulidae, the ovulids, cowry allies or false cowries.
