= Margovula translineata =

Scientific classification
- Kingdom: Animalia
- Phylum: Mollusca
- Class: Gastropoda
- Subclass: Caenogastropoda
- Order: Littorinimorpha
- Family: Ovulidae
- Genus: Margovula
- Species: M. translineata

Binomial name
- Margovula translineata (Cate, 1973)

Synonyms
- Pseudosimnia translineata Cate, 1973

Species of gastropod

Margovula translineata is a species of sea snail, a marine gastropod mollusk in the family Ovulidae, the ovulids, cowry allies or false cowries.
