= Diminovula incisa =

Scientific classification
- Kingdom: Animalia
- Phylum: Mollusca
- Class: Gastropoda
- Subclass: Caenogastropoda
- Order: Littorinimorpha
- Family: Ovulidae
- Genus: Diminovula
- Species: D. incisa

Binomial name
- Diminovula incisa Azuma & Cate, 1971

Synonyms
- Pseudosimnia incisa Azuma & Cate, 1971

Species of gastropod

Diminovula incisa is a species of sea snail in the family Ovulidae, the ovulids, cowry allies or false cowries.
