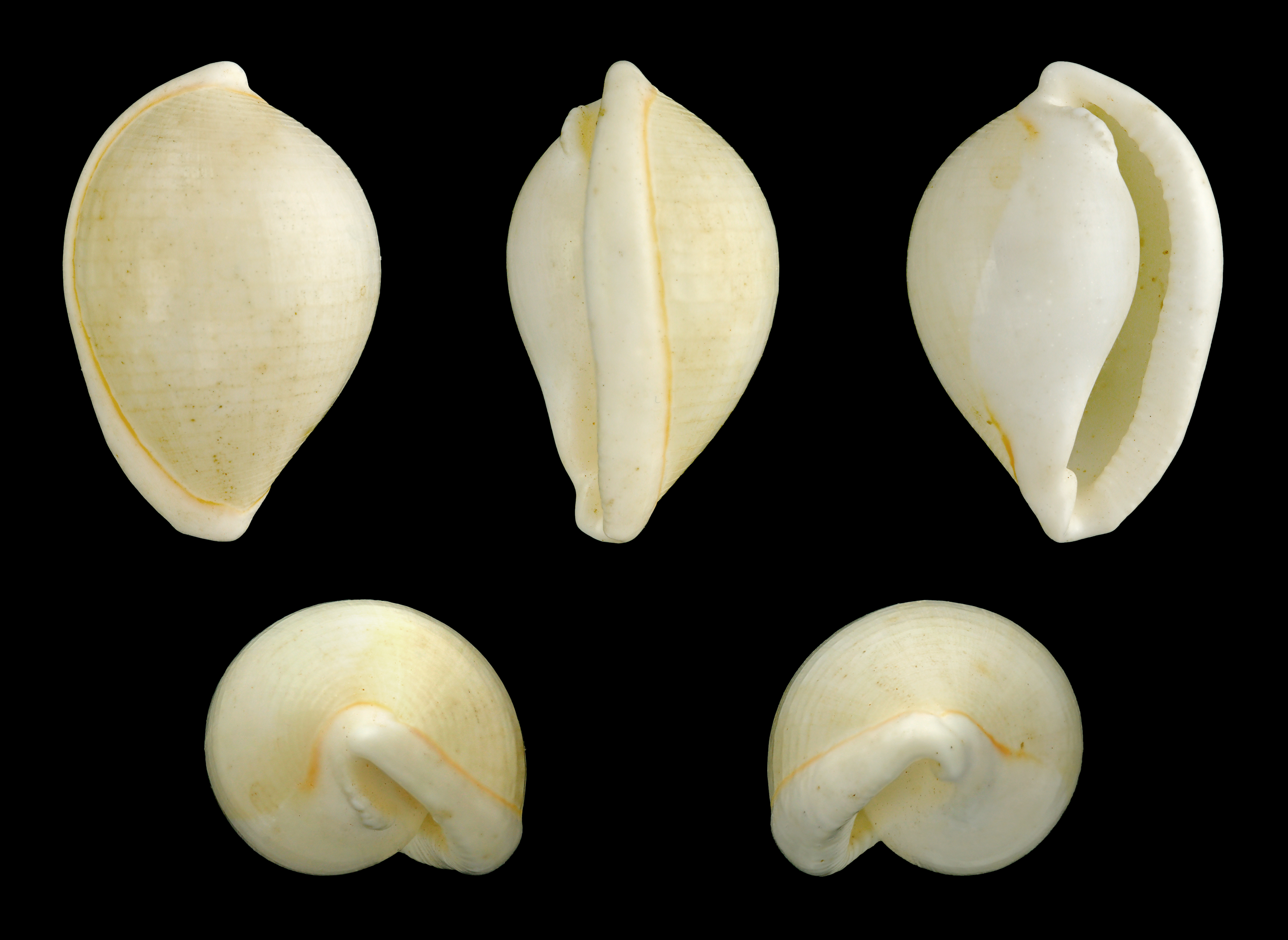

Scientific classification
- Kingdom: Animalia
- Phylum: Mollusca
- Class: Gastropoda
- Subclass: Caenogastropoda
- Order: Littorinimorpha
- Family: Ovulidae
- Genus: Margovula
- Species: M. marginata

Binomial name
- Margovula marginata (Sowerby I, 1828)

Synonyms
- Margovula schilderorum Cate, C.N., 1973; Ovula adamsi Paetel, F., 1887; Ovulum marginatum Sowerby I, 1828; Ovulum sinensis Sowerby III, 1874; Pseudosimnia marginata Sowerby I, 1828

= Margovula marginata =

Chinese egg shell

Species of gastropod

Margovula marginata, common name the Chinese egg shell, is a species of sea snail, a marine gastropod mollusk in the family Ovulidae, the ovulids, cowry allies or false cowries.

== Description ==
The size of an adult shell varies between 8 mm and 30 mm. The shell is rather thin, semitransparent, white, and encircled with an orange line at the margin. It is very obscurely decussated. Its interior is milkwhite. The length of the shell varies between 21 mm and 30 mm.

== Distribution ==
This marine species occurs in the demersal zone of the Red Sea and in the Central Indo-West Pacific off the Philippines and China.
