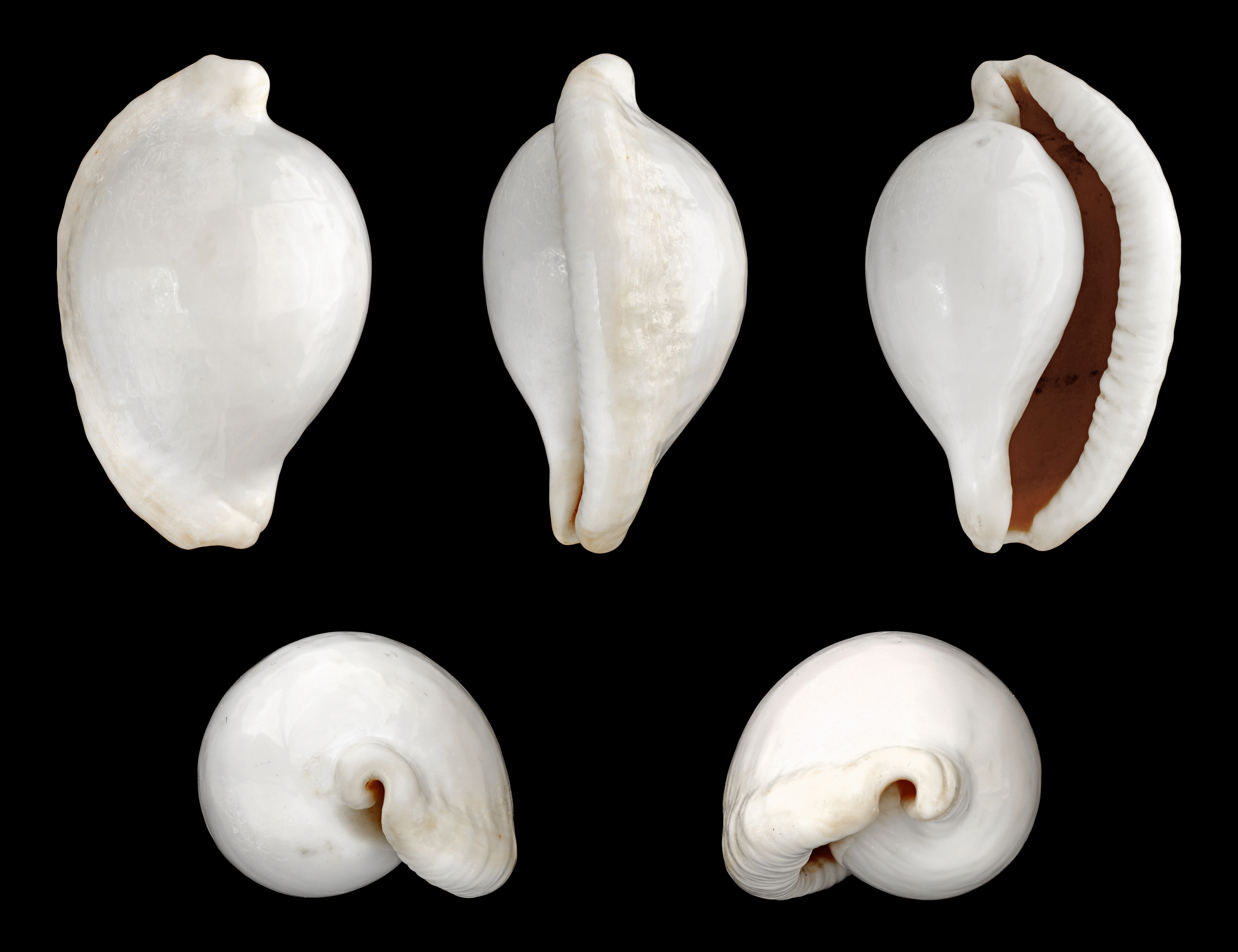
- Ovula ovum

Scientific classification
- Kingdom: Animalia
- Phylum: Mollusca
- Class: Gastropoda
- Subclass: Caenogastropoda
- Order: Littorinimorpha
- Superfamily: Cypraeoidea
- Family: Ovulidae
- Subfamily: Ovulinae
- Genus: Ovula; Bruguière, 1789

Synonyms
- Amphiperas Gronovius, 1781; Ovulum Sowerby I, 1828; Particium Iredale, 1935

= Ovula =

Genus of gastropods

Ovula is a genus of sea snails, marine gastropod mollusks in the family Ovulidae.

== Species ==
Species within the genus Ovula include:

- Ovula costellata Lamarck, 1810
- Ovula ishibashii (Kuroda, 1928)
- Ovula ovum (Linnaeus, 1758)

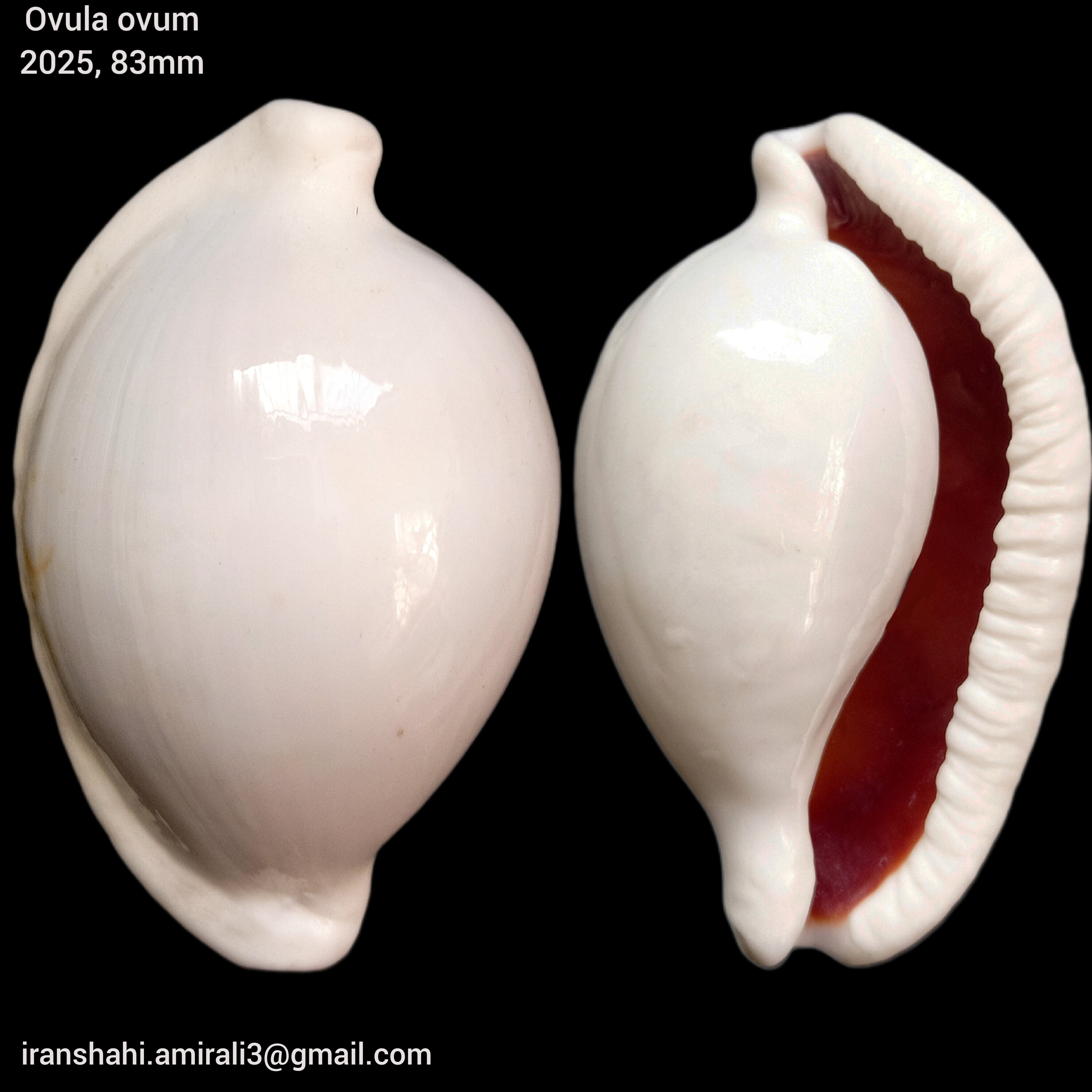
Ovula ovum

== Synonyms ==
- Ovula (Neosimnia) P. Fischer, 1884: synonym of Neosimnia P. Fischer, 1884 (original rank)
- Ovula acicularis sensu Tryon, 1885 not Lamarck, 1810: synonym of Simnia spelta (Linnaeus, 1758) (synonym)
- Ovula acicularis Lamarck, 1810: synonym of Cymbovula acicularis (Lamarck, 1810) (original combination)
- Ovula adamsi Weinkauff, 1881: synonym of Procalpurnus semistriatus (Pease, 1863)
- Ovula adamsii (Dunker, 1877): synonym of Phenacovolva rosea (A. Adams, 1855)
- Ovula adriatica (G. B. Sowerby I, 1828): synonym of Aperiovula adriatica (G. B. Sowerby I, 1828): synonym of Pseudosimnia adriatica (G. B. Sowerby I, 1828) (unaccepted generic combination)
- Ovula alba Perry, 1811: synonym of Ovula ovum (Linnaeus, 1758)
- Ovula angulosa Lamarck, 1822: synonym of Ovula costellata Lamarck, 1810
- Ovula antillarum (Reeve, 1865): synonym of Simnialena uniplicata (G. B. Sowerby II, 1849)
- Ovula aspera Perry, 1811: synonym of Volva volva (Linnaeus, 1758)
- Ovula birostris (Linnaeus, 1767): synonym of Phenacovolva birostris (Linnaeus, 1767)
- Ovula birostris sensu Tryon, 1885 not Linnaeus, 1767: synonym of Simnia aperta (G. B. Sowerby II, 1849)
- Ovula blainvillei Leach, 1847: synonym of Simnia patula (Pennant, 1777)
- Ovula blanville Leach, 1847: synonym of Simnia patula (Pennant, 1777)
- Ovula bullata (Gould, 1861): synonym of Globovula cavanaghi (Iredale, 1931)
- Ovula bullata sensu Tryon, 1885 not A. Adams & Reeve, 1848: synonym of Sandalia triticea (Lamarck, 1810)
- Ovula caledonica Crosse, 1871: synonym of Diminovula caledonica (Crosse, 1871) (original combination)
- Ovula canadiensis sensu Tryon, 1885 not Weinkauff, 1882: synonym of Simnialena uniplicata (G. B. Sowerby II, 1849)
- Ovula carnea (Poiret, 1789): synonym of Pseudosimnia carnea (Poiret, 1789)
- Ovula carolinensis Mörch, 1877: synonym of Simnialena uniplicata (G. B. Sowerby II, 1849)
- Ovula cepula Schumacher, 1817: synonym of Pseudosimnia carnea (Poiret, 1789) (synonym)
- Ovula columba Schubert & J. A. Wagner, 1829: synonym of Ovula costellata Lamarck, 1810
- Ovula cristallina Kiener, 1843: synonym of Diminovula alabaster (Reeve, 1865)
- Ovula cumingi Mörch, 1850: synonym of Diminovula concinna (G. B. Sowerby II, 1848)
- Ovula cygnea Röding, 1798: synonym of Ovula ovum (Linnaeus, 1758)
- Ovula deflexa (G. B. Sowerby II, 1849): synonym of Naviculavolva deflexa (G. B. Sowerby II, 1849)
- Ovula dentata Fischer von Waldheim, 1807: synonym of Pseudosimnia carnea (Poiret, 1789) (synonym)
- Ovula dentata sensu Angas, 1887 not G. B. Sowerby II, 1848: synonym of Crenavolva traillii (A. Adams, 1856)
- Ovula formosa sensu Verco, 1935 not G. B. Sowerby II, 1848: synonym of Cuspivolva platysia (C. N. Cate, 1973)
- Ovula haliotidea Blainville, 1825: synonym of Pseudosimnia adriatica (G. B. Sowerby I, 1828) (synonym)
- Ovula hervieri Hedley, 1899: synonym of Habuprionovolva hervieri (Hedley, 1899) (original combination)
- Ovula hirasei Pilsbry, 1913: synonym of Quasisimnia hirasei (Pilsbry, 1913)
- Ovula hordacea Kiener, 1843: synonym of Neosimnia avena (G. B. Sowerby I, 1833): synonym of Simnia avena (G. B. Sowerby I, 1833)
- Ovula inflexa (G. B. Sowerby I, 1832): synonym of Simnialena rufa (G. B. Sowerby I, 1833)
- Ovula insculpta Odhner, 1919: synonym of Phenacovolva insculpta (Odhner, 1919)
- Ovula intermedia sensu Tryon, 1885 not G. B. Sowerby I, 1828: synonym of Simnia spelta (Linnaeus, 1758) (synonym)
- Ovula ishibashii auctt.: synonym of Ovula isibasii (Kuroda, 1929) (unjustified emendation)
- Ovula lactea Lamarck, 1810: synonym of Procalpurnus lacteus (Lamarck, 1810) (original combination)
- Ovula lactea sensu Tryon, 1885 not Lamarck, 1810: synonym of Diminovula alabaster (Reeve, 1865)
- Ovula loebbeckeana Weinkauff, 1881: synonym of Simnia loebbeckeana (Weinkauff, 1881) (original combination)
- Ovula lutea Pallary, 1900: synonym of Neosimnia spelta (Linnaeus, 1758): synonym of Simnia spelta (Linnaeus, 1758)
- Ovula margarita sensu A. Adams, 1854 not G. B. Sowerby I, 1828: synonym of Diminovula concinna (G. B. Sowerby II, 1848)
- Ovula nigerina Dufo, 1840: synonym of Crenavolva striatula (G. B. Sowerby I, 1828)
- Ovula nipponensis Pilsbry, 1913: synonym of Testudovolva nipponensis (Pilsbry, 1913)
- Ovula obsoleta Locard, 1891: synonym of Simnia spelta (Linnaeus, 1758) (synonym)
- Ovula oviformis Lamarck, 1801: synonym of Ovula ovum (Linnaeus, 1758)
- Ovula papyracea Fischer von Waldheim, 1807: synonym of Ovula ovum (Linnaeus, 1758)
- Ovula pennantiana Leach, 1847: synonym of Simnia patula (Pennant, 1777)
- Ovula perla Röding, 1798: synonym of Calpurnus verrucosus (Linnaeus, 1758) (synonym)
- Ovula pharetra Perry, 1811: synonym of Cyphoma gibbosum (Linnaeus, 1758)
- Ovula philippinarum sensu Tryon, 1885 not G. B. Sowerby II, 1849: synonym of Phenacovolva rosea (A. Adams, 1855)
- Ovula pudica sensu Tryon, 1885 not A. Adams, 1855: synonym of Diminovula caledonica (Crosse, 1871)
- Ovula punctata Duclos, 1828: synonym of Diminovula punctata (Duclos, 1828) (original combination)
- Ovula pygmaea G. B. Sowerby I, 1828: synonym of Ovula ovum (Linnaeus, 1758)
- Ovula rhodia (A. Adams, 1854): synonym of Sandalia triticea (Lamarck, 1810)
- Ovula rosea Pallary, 1900: synonym of Neosimnia spelta (Linnaeus, 1758): synonym of Simnia spelta (Linnaeus, 1758)
- Ovula rosea Rossiter, 1883: synonym of Aclyvolva lanceolata (G. B. Sowerby II, 1849)
- Ovula roseocarnea Bucquoy, Dautzenberg & Dollfus, 1883: synonym of Neosimnia spelta (Linnaeus, 1758): synonym of Simnia spelta (Linnaeus, 1758)
- Ovula rostrata Mörch, 1877: synonym of Cyphoma gibbosum (Linnaeus, 1758)
- Ovula rufula Mollerat, 1890: synonym of Pseudosimnia carnea (Poiret, 1789)
- Ovula seccato G. B. Sowerby I, 1834: synonym of Cyphoma intermedium (G. B. Sowerby I, 1828)
- Ovula semperi Weinkauff, 1881: synonym of Prosimnia semperi (Weinkauff, 1881) (original combination)
- Ovula sowerbyana Weinkauff, 1881: synonym of Phenacovolva brevirostris (Schumacher, 1817)
- Ovula sowerbyana sensu Tryon, 1885 not Weinkauff, 1881: synonym of Simnia spelta (Linnaeus, 1758) (synonym)
- Ovula spelta (Linnaeus, 1758): synonym of Simnia spelta (Linnaeus, 1758)
- Ovula striata Lamarck, 1810: synonym of Volva striata (Lamarck, 1810)
- Ovula textoria Röding, 1798: synonym of Volva volva (Linnaeus, 1758)
- Ovula tortilis Deshayes, 1844: synonym of Ovula angulosa Lamarck, 1822: synonym of Ovula costellata Lamarck, 1810
- Ovula triticea Lamarck, 1810: synonym of Sandalia triticea (Lamarck, 1810)
- Ovula triticea Lamarck, 1810 sensu Payraudeau, 1826: synonym of Simnia nicaeensis Risso, 1826: synonym of Simnia spelta (Linnaeus, 1758) (misapplication)
- Ovula triticea P. J. Fischer, 1927: synonym of Prosimnia semperi (Weinkauff, 1881)
- Ovula tuberculosa Gray & G. B. Sowerby II, 1839: synonym of Crenavolva striatula (G. B. Sowerby I, 1828)
- Ovula uniplicata sensu Tryon, 1885 not G. B. Sowerby II, 1848: synonym of Neosimnia loebbeckeana (Weinkauff, 1881): synonym of Simnia loebbeckeana (Weinkauff, 1881)
