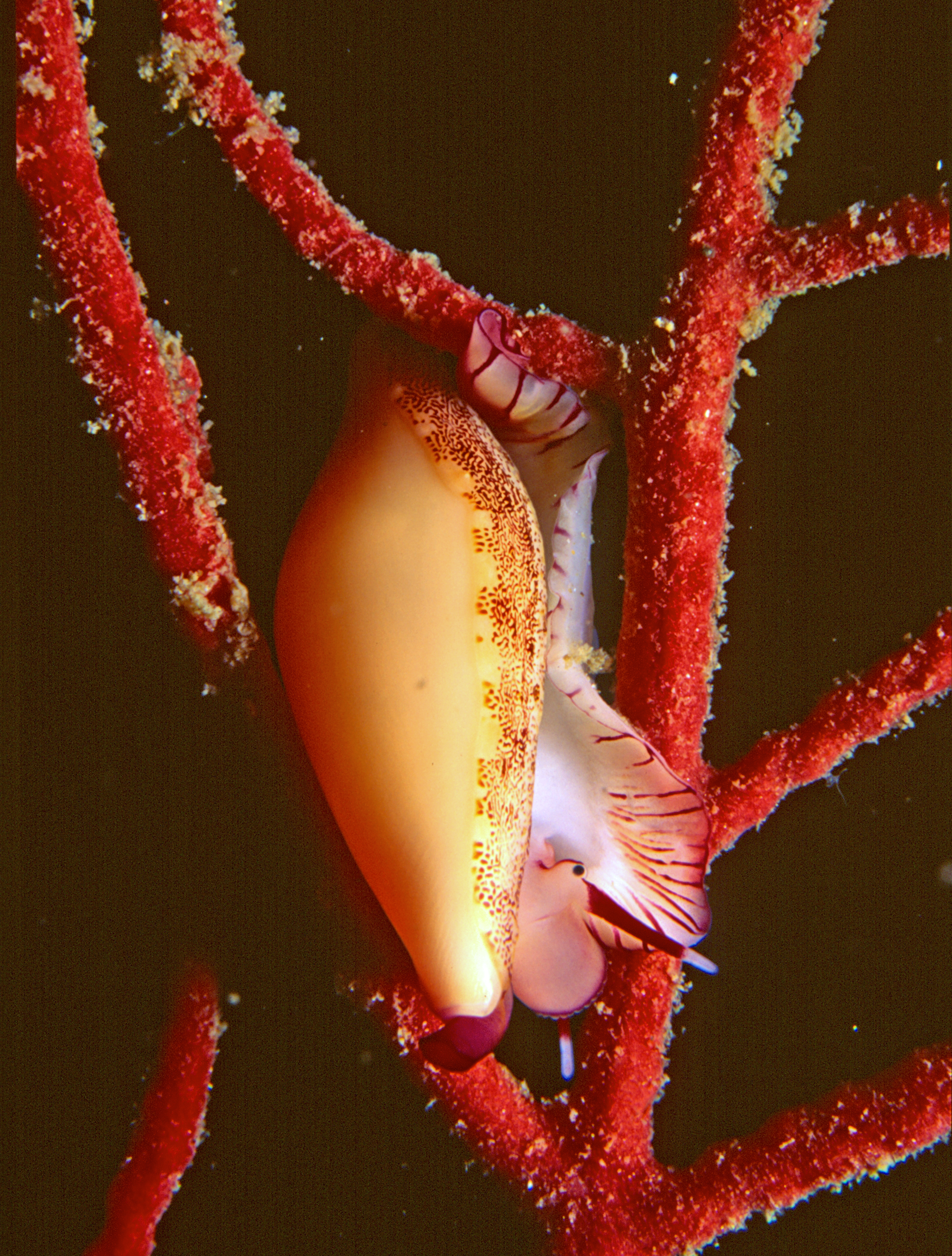
- a live Simnia spelta on soft coral Leptogorgia sarmentosa
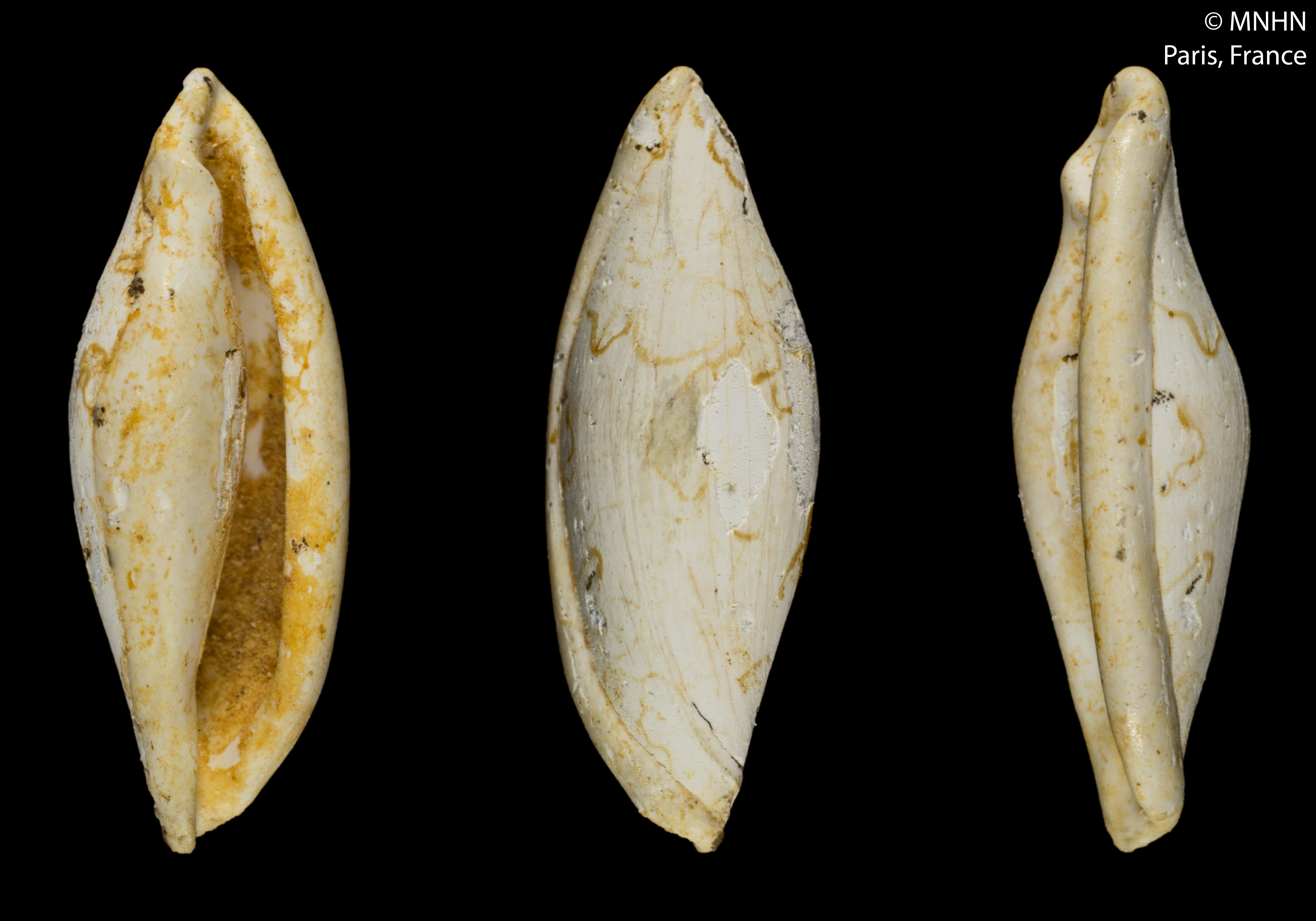
- Shell of † Simnia fusulina (holotype at MNHN, Paris)

Scientific classification
- Kingdom: Animalia
- Phylum: Mollusca
- Class: Gastropoda
- Subclass: Caenogastropoda
- Order: Littorinimorpha
- Family: Ovulidae
- Subfamily: Simniinae
- Genus: Simnia; Risso, 1826

Type species
- Simnia nicaeensis Risso, 1826

Synonyms
- Amphiperas (Neosimnia) P. Fischer, 1884; Amphiperas(Simnia) Risso, 1826; Neosimnia P. Fischer, 1884; Ovula (Neosimnia) P. Fischer, 1884 (original rank); Ovula (Simnia) Risso, 1826; Simia [sic] (misspelling); Simnia (Neosimnia) P. Fischer, 1884; Spiculata Cate, 1973; Subsimnia C. N. Cate, 1973

= Simnia =

Genus of gastropods

Simnia is a genus of sea snails, marine gastropod molluscs in the family Ovulidae.

== Taxonomy ==
Dolin & Ledon (2002) considered that the lectotype of Simnia nicaeensis Risso, 1826, type species of Simnia, is a juvenile specimen of Simnia spelta (Linnaeus, 1758) type species of Neosimnia Fischer, 1884. This makes Simnia an objective synonym of Neosimnia. Accordingly, all the species treated in Lorenz & Fehse (2009) under Neosimnia should thereby be accepted under Simnia. Likewise, all the species treated by Lorenz & Fehse (2009) under Simnia should thereby be accepted under Xandarovula Cate, 1973. The assumptions of Dolin (Dolin & Ledon, 2002) are based on interpretations but not on the examination of the type material. Fehse (2016) has confirmed the vaility of the genus Neosimnia because the lectotype of Simnia nicaeensis Risso, 1826, type species of Simnia, is never a juvenile specimen of Simnia spelta (Linnaeus, 1758) type species of Neosimnia Fischer, 1884.

== Species ==
The valid assignment of the taxa are found in Lorenz & Fehse, 2009. The assumption of Dolin prepared the following chaos: Species within the genus Simnia include:

- Simnia aperta (Sowerby II, 1849)
- Simnia arcuata (Reeve, 1865)
- Simnia avena (G.B. Sowerby I, 1832)
- Simnia barbarensis Dall, 1892
- Simnia bartschi (Cate, 1973)
- Simnia bijuri (Cate, 1976)
- † Simnia brevicula (Celzard & Dovesi, 2024)
- † Simnia fusulina Dolin & Lozouet, 2004
- † Simnia graniformis (Celzard & Dovesi, 2024)
- Simnia hammesi (Bertsch & Bibbey, 1982)
- † Simnia helenae Dolin & Lozouet, 2004
- † Simnia leathesi (J. de C. Sowerby, 1826)
- † Simnia lhommei (Cossmann, 1907)
- † Simnia limondinae Dolin & Lozouet, 2004
- Simnia loebbeckeana (Weinkauff, 1881)
- Simnia macleani (Cate, 1976)
- † Simnia multilineata (Celzard & Dovesi, 2024)
- Simnia patula (Pennant, 1777)
- Simnia pliomajor (Sacco, 1894)
- † Simnia pseudolaevis (Celzard & Dovesi, 2024)
- † Simnia pulchra (Celzard & Dovesi, 2024)
- † Simnia rostralina (Deshayes, 1865)
- † Simnia scobina (Garvie, 1996)
- Simnia sculptura (Cate, 1973)
- † Simnia semen (Defrance, 1825)
- Simnia senegalensis (Schilder, 1931)
- Simnia spelta (Linnaeus, 1758)

Species brought into synonymy

- Simnia acicularis (Lamarck, 1811): synonym of Cymbovula acicularis (Lamarck, 1811)
- Simnia aequalis (G. B. Sowerby I, 1832): synonym of Neosimnia avena (G. B. Sowerby I, 1833) synonym of Simnia avena (G. B. Sowerby I, 1833)
- Simnia aureocincta Dall, 1899: synonym of Cyphoma aureocinctum (Dall, 1889)
- Simnia brevirostris (Schumacher, 1817): synonym of Phenacovolva brevirostris (Schumacher, 1817)
- Simnia hiscocki Lorenz & Melaun, 2011: synonym of Xandarovula hiscocki (Lorenz & Melaun, 2011) (superseded combination)
- Simnia hyalina Lorenz & Fehse, 2009: synonym of Xandarovula hyalina (Lorenz & Fehse, 2009) (superseded combination)
- Simnia illyrica (Schilder, 1925): synonym of Simnia spelta (Linnaeus, 1758) (junior subjective synonym)
- Simnia inflexa Schilder, 1941: synonym of Simnialena rufa (Sowerby I, 1832)
- Simnia inflexa (Sowerby I, 1832): synonym of Simnialena rufa (Sowerby I, 1832)
- Simnia jacintoi Fehse & Trigo, 2015: synonym of Xandarovula jacintoi (Fehse & Trigo, 2015) (superseded combination)
- Simnia nicaeensis Risso, 1826: synonym of Simnia spelta (Linnaeus, 1758)
- Simnia nicaoensis Risso, 1826: synonym of Simnia nicaeensis Risso, 1826
- Simnia piragua Dall, 1889: synonym of Calcarovula piragua (Dall, 1889)
- Simnia rufa (Sowerby II, 1832): synonym of Simnialena rufa (Sowerby II, 1832)
- Simnia sowerbyana Paetel, 1887: synonym of Phenacovolva brevirostris (Schumacher, 1817)
- Simnia uniplicata (Sowerby II, 1849): synonym of Simnialena uniplicata (Sowerby II, 1849)
- † Simnia vibrayana (de Raincourt, 1870) : synonym of † Sandalia vibrayana (de Raincourt, 1870) (superseded combination)
- Simnia vidleri (Sowerby III, 1881): synonym of Simnia arcuata (Reeve, 1865) (junior subjective synonym)
- Simnia xanthochila Kuroda, 1928: synonym of Contrasimnia xanthochila (Kuroda, 1928)
