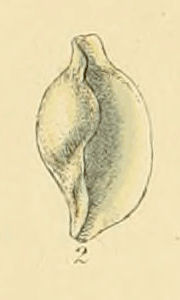
- Xandarovula patula shell

Scientific classification
- Kingdom: Animalia
- Phylum: Mollusca
- Class: Gastropoda
- Subclass: Caenogastropoda
- Order: Littorinimorpha
- Family: Ovulidae
- Subfamily: Simniinae
- Genus: Xandarovula; Cate, 1973

= Xandarovula =

Genus of gastropods

Xandarovula is a genus of sea snails, marine gastropod mollusks in the family Ovulidae.

== Species ==
Species within the genus Xandarovula include:

- Xandarovula aetheria Nappo, 2024
- Xandarovula aperta (Sowerby II, 1949)
- Xandarovula hiscocki (Lorenz & Melaun, 2011)
- Xandarovula hyalina (Lorenz & Fehse, 2009)
- Xandarovula jacintoi (Fehse & Trigo, 2015)
- Xandarovula patula (Pennant, 1777)

Synonyms

- Xandarovula figgisae C. N. Cate, 1973: synonym of Ovula ovum (Linnaeus, 1758) (junior subjective synonym)
- Xandarovula formosana (M. Azuma, 1972): synonym of Contrasimnia formosana (M. Azuma, 1972) (superseded combination)
- Xandarovula hammesi Bertsch & Bibbey, 1982: synonym of Simnia hammesi (Bertsch & Bibbey, 1982) (original combination)
- Xandarovula pagoda C. N. Cate, 1973: synonym of Contrasimnia pagoda (C. N. Cate, 1973) (superseded combination)
- Xandarovula xanthochila (Kuroda, 1928): synonym of Contrasimnia xanthochila (Kuroda, 1928)
