= Vicetia =

Vicetia may refer to:

- Vicetia, a former name for the Italian city of Vicenza
- Vicetia (gastropod), a genus of molluscs in the family Cypraeidae
