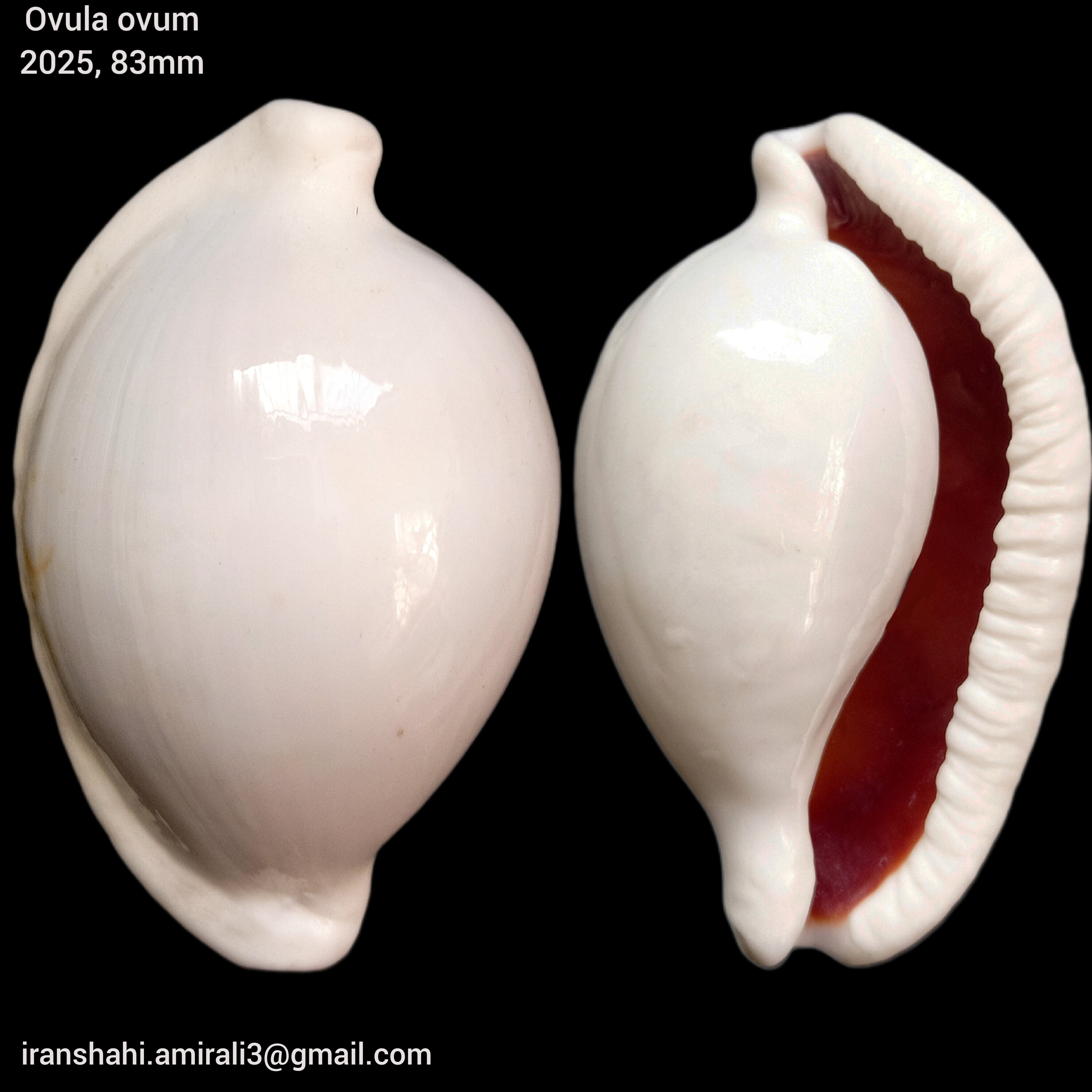
- Ovula ovum

Scientific classification
- Kingdom: Animalia
- Phylum: Mollusca
- Class: Gastropoda
- Subclass: Caenogastropoda
- Order: Littorinimorpha
- Superfamily: Cypraeoidea
- Family: Ovulidae
- Subfamily: Ovulinae; J. Fleming, 1828

Genera
- See text

= Ovulinae =

Subfamily of gastropods

The subfamily Ovulinae, common name the ovulines, is a highly specialized, extant group of sea snails in the family Ovulidae. These are predatory or parasitic sea snails, marine gastropod mollusks within the superfamily Cypraeoidea. Species in this subfamily are sometimes referred to as cowries (singular: cowry or cowrie), although this name is commonly used for any member of the superfamily Cypraeoidea.

== Description ==
Ovulinae typically have either an ovate (egg-shaped), lanceolate (lance-shaped) or pyriform (pear-shaped) shell. The spire is not prominent, and the funiculum is absent. The anal canal is twisted anteriorly. The extremities are usually short and the outer lip of the aperture has well-developed teeth. The mantle usually completely covers the shell in life. The mantle is typically brightly colored, while the shell is often white, although in some cases the shell is pink or even red. This can easily be seen in photographs of the snails.

== Habitat ==
Ovulines live parasitically on anthozoans (of the phylum Cnidaria), feeding off of the exterior of the organism. In these cases, the ovuline species in question has almost always evolved a size, shape, and color that mimics the appearance of the cnidarians and camouflages itself with it. Alimentary homochromy, or the process of gaining the pigmentation of a host by feeding on the host, further helps to hide ovulines amongst their prey. Most members of the Ovulines live in tropical and subtropical waters.

== Taxonomy ==
Species within the family Ovulidae have been reclassified numerous times throughout the 19th, 20th, and 21st centuries, and this has also affected the classification of the subfamily Ovulinae (Shilder 1932, Allan 1956, Cate 1973, Fehse 2001). Historically, the Ovulids were separated into two subfamilies, Ovulinae and Volvinae, although this is no longer true. The taxonomy has changed often.

=== Bouchet & Rocroi (2005) ===
Bouchet and Rocroi (2005) present the following subfamilies of the family Ovulidae, of which Ovulinae is a subfamily.

- Ovulinae Fleming, 1822
- Cypraediinae Schilder, 1927
- Jenneriinae Thiele, 1929
- Pediculariinae Gray, 1853
- Pseudocypraeinae Steadman & Cotton, 1943

=== Fehse (2007) ===
Fehse (2007) presents the following subfamilies of the family Ovulidae, of which Ovulinae is a subfamily.

- Prionovolvinae Fehse, 2007
- Simniinae Schilder, 1925
- Ovulinae Fleming, 1828
- Aclyvolvinae Fehse, 2007

At least one researcher suggests that there is still much work to be done is properly categorizing the taxonomy of the Ovulids in general, and the Ovulines in particular.

=== Genera ===
Genera within the Ovulinae include:

- Calcarovula C. N. Cate, 1973
- Kurodaovula Azuma, 1987
- Ovula Bruguière, 1789
- Pellasimnia Schilder, 1939
- Phenacovolva Iredale, 1930
- Takasagovolva Azuma, 1974
- Volva Röding, 1798

Genera brought into synonymy

- Amphiperas Herrmannsen, 1846: synonym of Ovula Bruguière, 1789
- Birostra Swainson, 1840: synonym of Volva Röding, 1798
- Birostris Fabricius, 1823: synonym of Volva Röding, 1798
- Ovulum G. B. Sowerby I, 1828: synonym of Ovula Bruguière, 1789 (invalid: unjustified emendation of Ovula)
- Parlicium Schilder, 1939: synonym of Ovula Bruguière, 1789
- Radius Montfort, 1810: synonym of Volva Röding, 1798
- Primovula
- Diminovula
- Margovula
- Calpurnus
- Procalpurnus
