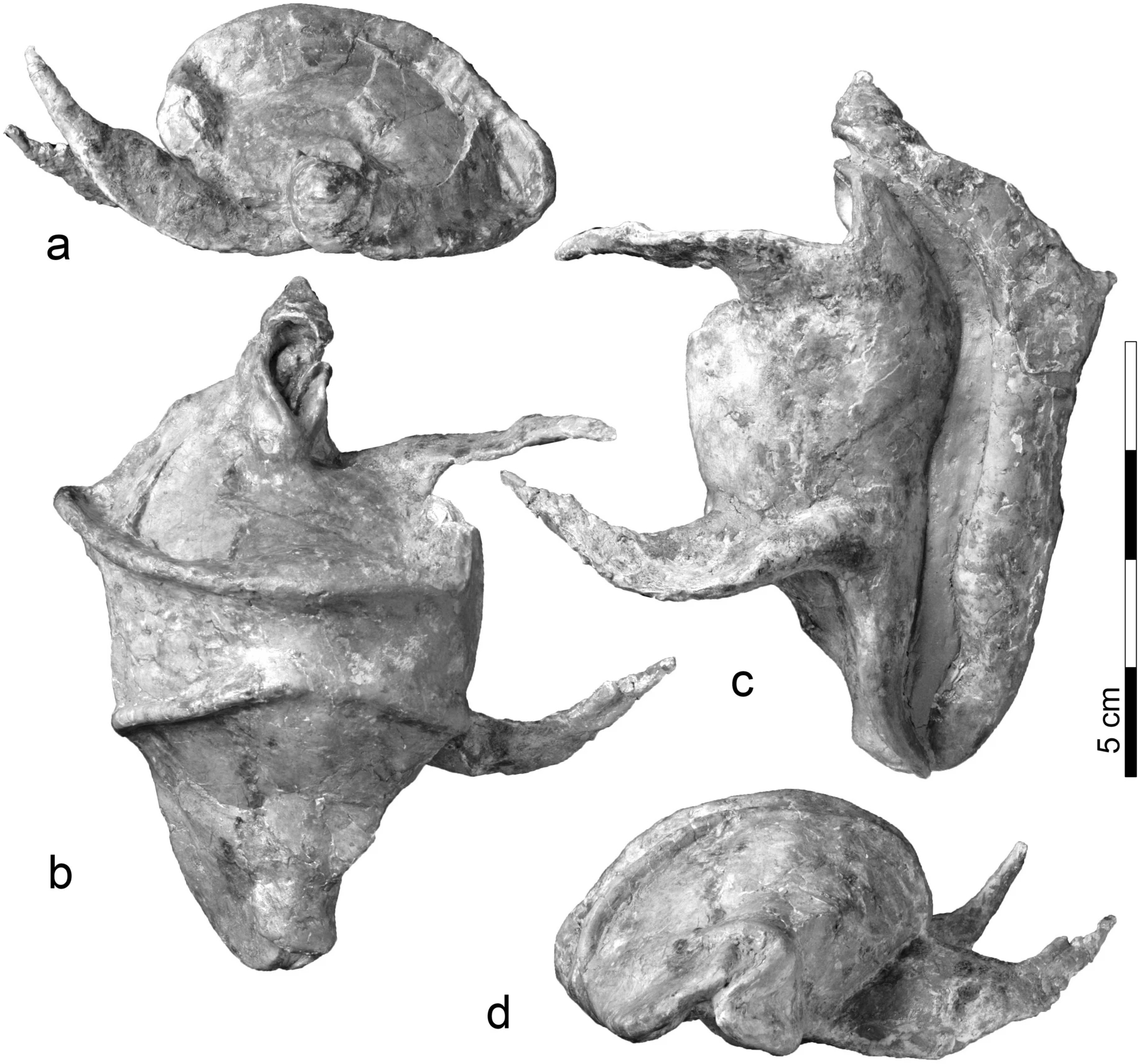
- Vicetia bizzottoi, the last and most derived species of the genus

Scientific classification
- Kingdom: Animalia
- Phylum: Mollusca
- Class: Gastropoda
- Subclass: Caenogastropoda
- Order: Littorinimorpha
- Family: Cypraeidae
- Genus: †Vicetia; Fabiani, 1905

Type species
- Ovula hantkeni Lefèvre, 1878

Species
- V. bellardii (Deshayes in Bellardi, 1852); V. bizzottoi Dominici, Fornasiero & Giusberti, 2020; V. gennevauxi (Doncieux, 1908); V. hantkeni (Lefèvre, 1878); V. jamesi (Vredenburg, 1927)

= Vicetia (gastropod) =

Vicetia Temporal range: Eocene 56–38 Ma

Genus of cowrie from the Eocene of Europe and Pakistan

Vicetia is an extinct genus of cowrie from the Eocene of Europe and Pakistan. Five species are currently recognized with all European forms forming a single anagenetic lineage progressively growing bigger and developing stronger ornamentation. The last known species, V. bizzottoi, is the biggest known cowrie known to science with a shell length of 33.5 cm. They were likely feeding on sponges or algae and went extinct following widespread climate change at the end of the Eocene, giving way for more derived lineages of cowries.

== History and naming ==
The type species was named in 1878 by Théodore Lefèvre as a species of the genus Ovula (a type of false cowrie). The species "O." hantkeni was later transferred into the genus Gisortia, before eventually being recognized as a distinct animal, the name Vicetia being coined by Ramiro Fabiani in 1905. However its independence was not accepted by all scientists, with many continuing to consider it as synonymous with Gisortia or as a subgenus of the older name. Stefano Dominici and colleagues argue that the fossils preserve enough distinct traits to warrant the validity of the genus in their description of V. bizzottoi in 2020.

The name Vicetia is derived from the Italian town Vicenza.

== Description ==
Vicetia is diagnosed by the presence of two acute ridges which in later species converge towards the middle of the shell when viewing the shell from above. The shell forms two spikes that extend from the bottom of the shell and grow towards the left while curving upwards, tho the length and shape of these spikes differs between taxa, as does whether or not the tips are pointed or blunt. The type species for instance has relatively short and blunt protrusions while V. bizzottoi is known for its rather large spikes. The exhaling canal is typically twisted in form and protrudes towards the apex of the cowrie's shell. Generally these characteristics are weakest in the older species and can be seen to progressively develop throughout the Eocene, reaching their peak with the giant V. bizzottoi towards the end of the epoch.

Size likewise changed over time with early forms being relatively small compared to their later relatives. The smaller species include V. gennevauxi and V. hantkeni, with a shell length around 100 mm (3.9 in), while the largest species reach lengths of 280 mm (11 in) and 335 mm (13.2 in) for V. bellardii and V. bizzottoi respectively, making them the largest known cowries in history.

== Species ==
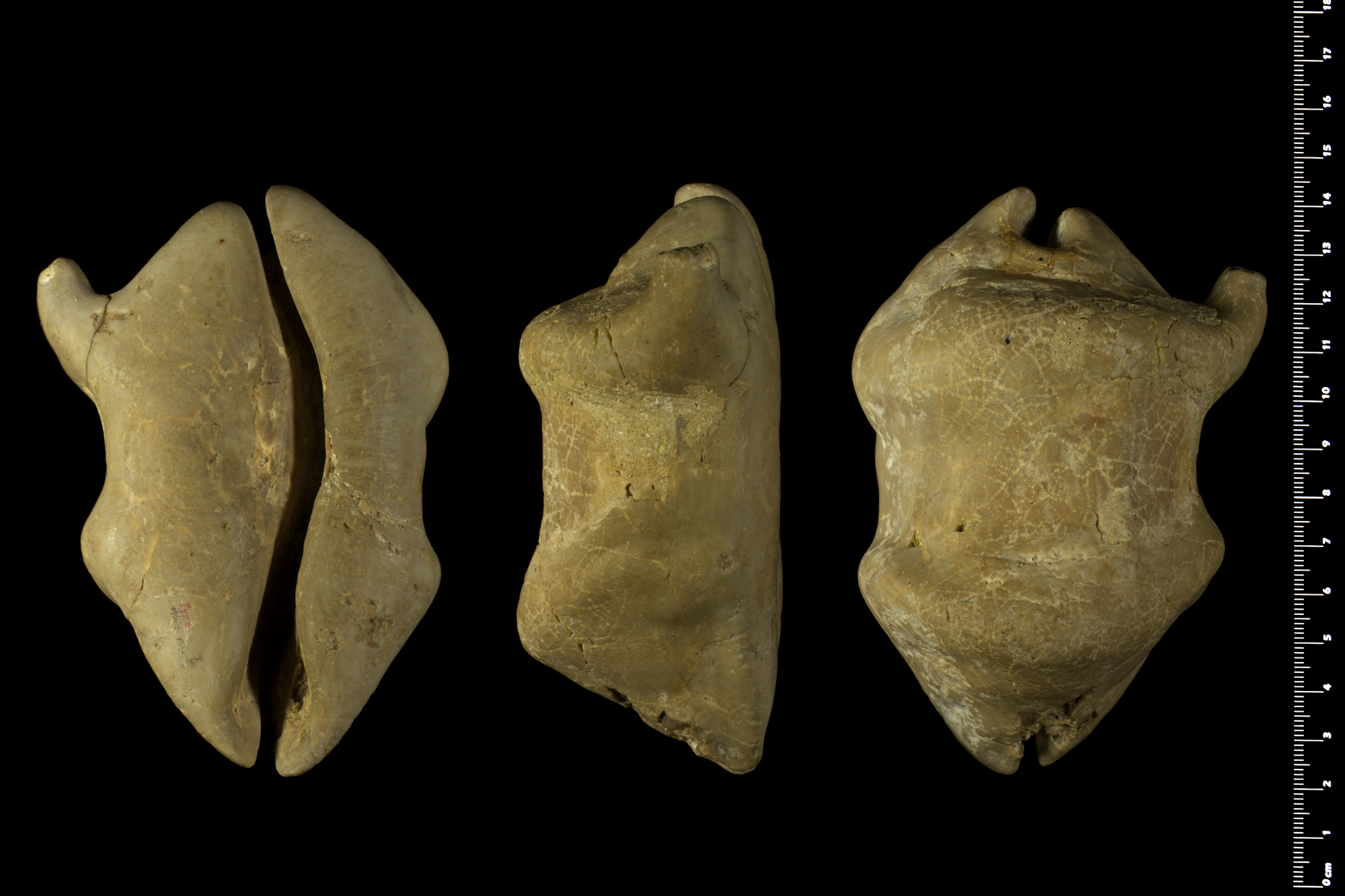
The type species of Vicetia, V. hantkeni

- Vicetia bellardii

V. bellardii was described in 1852 by Deshayes in Bellardi from fossils found in southern France. Fossils are also known from other parts of western Europe including the Paris Basin, northern France, the Pyrenees of Spain. Synonyms of V. bellardii include Ovula gigantea hoernesi (Lefèvre, 1878) and Gisortia vicetiana (Farrés and Stadt 2009). This species spans the Lutetian and Bartonian stages of the Eocene. It's a close relative of V. bizzottoi and one of the largest species, reaching a size of 280 mm (11 in). Its ridges are blunt and equally spaced from one another, the spikes sharp but rather short and blunt. The opening of the shell is slightly curved and wide and not sinuous as seen in V. bizzottoi and V. hantkeni. The exhaling canal of southern specimens is long but straight.

- Vicetia bizzottoi

The most recently described species, V. bizzottoi was found in the Possagno Marl Formation of north-east Italy. Its fossils date to the Priabonian, the latest stage of the Eocene. V. bizzottoi stands apart for being the largest species of the genus and an overall massive cowrie, twice the average size of members of its family. The posterior end of the shell is wider than its front, the shell opening narrow and twisted. The exhaling canal is a fifth of the entire shell's length, twisted and protruding. The characteristic ridges converge towards the middle of the shell before distancing themselves from one another again. The horns are long and pointed, the front horn merging with the outer lip while the hind one gradually disappears into the shell, but connects to the exhaling channel towards the rear. Each protuberance is curved upwards and about as long as the shell is wide at their point of origin. It represents the biggest Vicetia species with a length of up to 335 mm (13.2 in).

- Vicetia gennevauxi

A species known from the lower Eocene (Ypresian) of France, specifically around Coustouge in the French Pyrenees. It was originally described by Doncieux in 1908 and is the smallest species in the genus. It lacks most of the ornamentation the other species are known for, only showing two faint ridges which are used to assign it to the genus.

- Vicetia hantkeni

The type species, it was originally described as a species of Ovula by Lefèvre in 1878 based on upper Ypresian remains from Monte Postale, Italy. Remains of V. hantkeni have also been found elsewhere in Europe including the Lutetian of France. Both V. o’gormani and V. douvillei are synonyms of the species. V. hantkeni is a small species with blunt ridges that aren't as closely spaced as in other species. Unlike the other species it lacks the protruding exhaling canal and only one ventral spike is formed by the shell, which is notably shorter and blunter.

- Vicetia jamesi

V. jamesi was described by Vredenburg in 1927 from middle Eocene sediments of Pakistan.

== Evolution ==
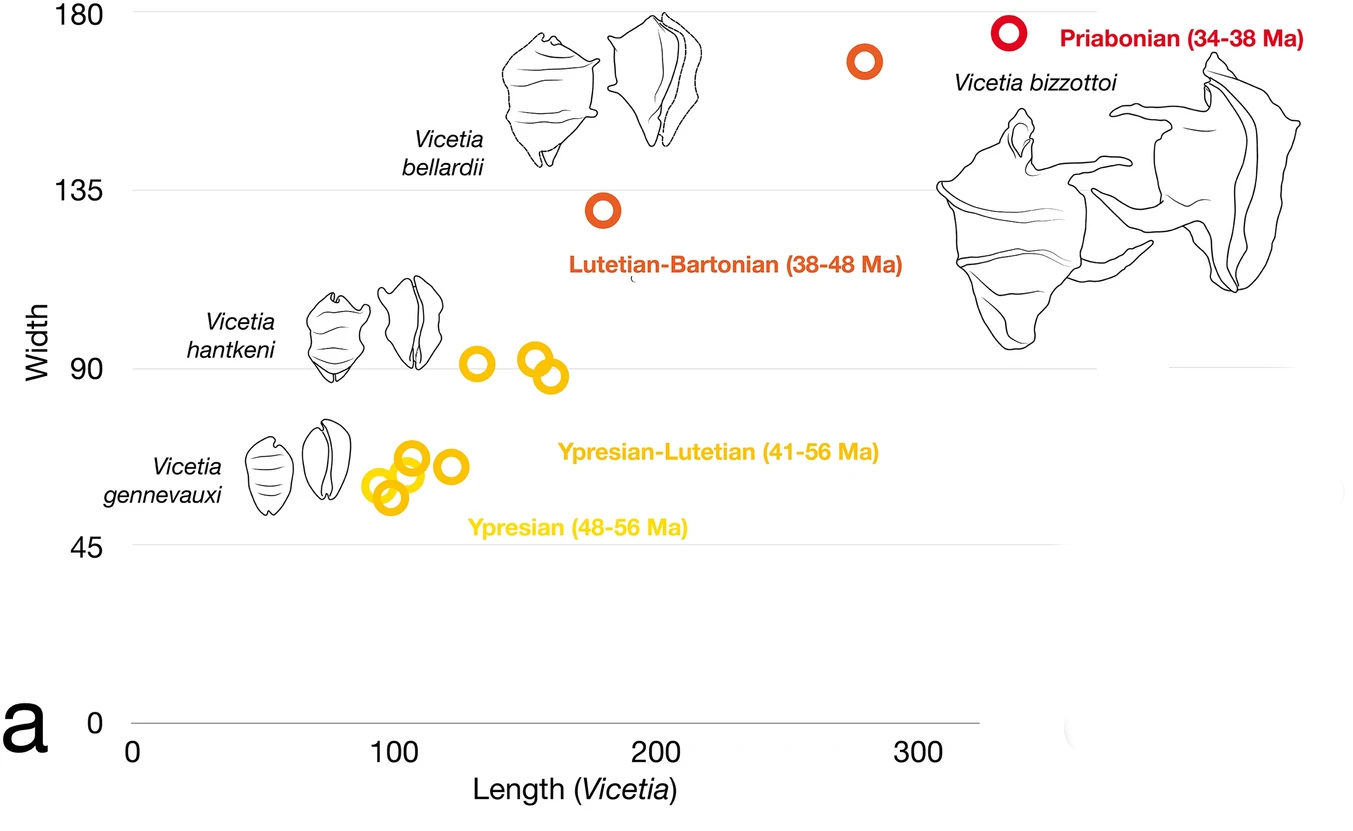
Evolution of the size and ornamentation of Vicetia

Among the four European species a clear trend across time can be observed. The earliest species, V. gennevauxi from the Ypresian, was relatively small with no pronounced ornamentation. It was immediately followed by V. hantkeni from the Ypresian to Lutetian, which marks an increase in size and better developed ridges and a single horn, although still relatively short and blunt. V. bellardii developed a second horn and has already obtained a large size of 280 mm, which is only exceeded by the Priabonian V. bizzottoi. This last species represents the final stage in the evolution of the genus with a massive size of 335 mm (13.2 in), well pronounced dorsal ridges and large, pointed and curved horns. This trend mirrors what is observed in the genus Gisortia, with the two species G. tuberculata and G. coombii showing a clear change of abundance from the Ypresian to Lutetian, with the later species gradually becoming more common than the former. Size increase can also be seen in the southern hemisphere with Zoila and Umbilia, which gradually increase in size throughout the Paleogene.

The extinction of the lineage was likely a result of the rapid climatic changes that occurred as the Eocene transitioned into the Oligocene, heavily affecting sealife and leading to a faunal turnover between basal cowries such as Vicetia to more derived Neogene lineages.

== Paleoecology ==
The Monte Postale Alveolina limestone, where the type species is found, preserves an environment that housed corall reefs during the Ypresian. Archicypraea lioyi was abundant and herbivores like Cerithium chaperi and Pseudobellardia gomphoceras. In the Spanish Ésera valley it co-occurred with Nummulites alongside other large molluscs and in Catalonia V. bellardii was found in association with Campanile and Velates as well as large deeper water forms like Discocyclina, bryozoans and echinoderms. Assuming a diet similar to their modern relatives, these giant cowries likely fed on sponges at depths of 30–50 m (98–164 ft) where they would be in competition with columbellids. It is also possible that they fed on algea, in which case they would have competed for resources with true conchs and other gastropods. Thus they may have been predators with a slow metabolism but great freedom of movement preying on immobile prey with poor nutritional value and later may have become herbivorous. The characteristic ridges and horns may have been used as a form of defense from larger animals.
