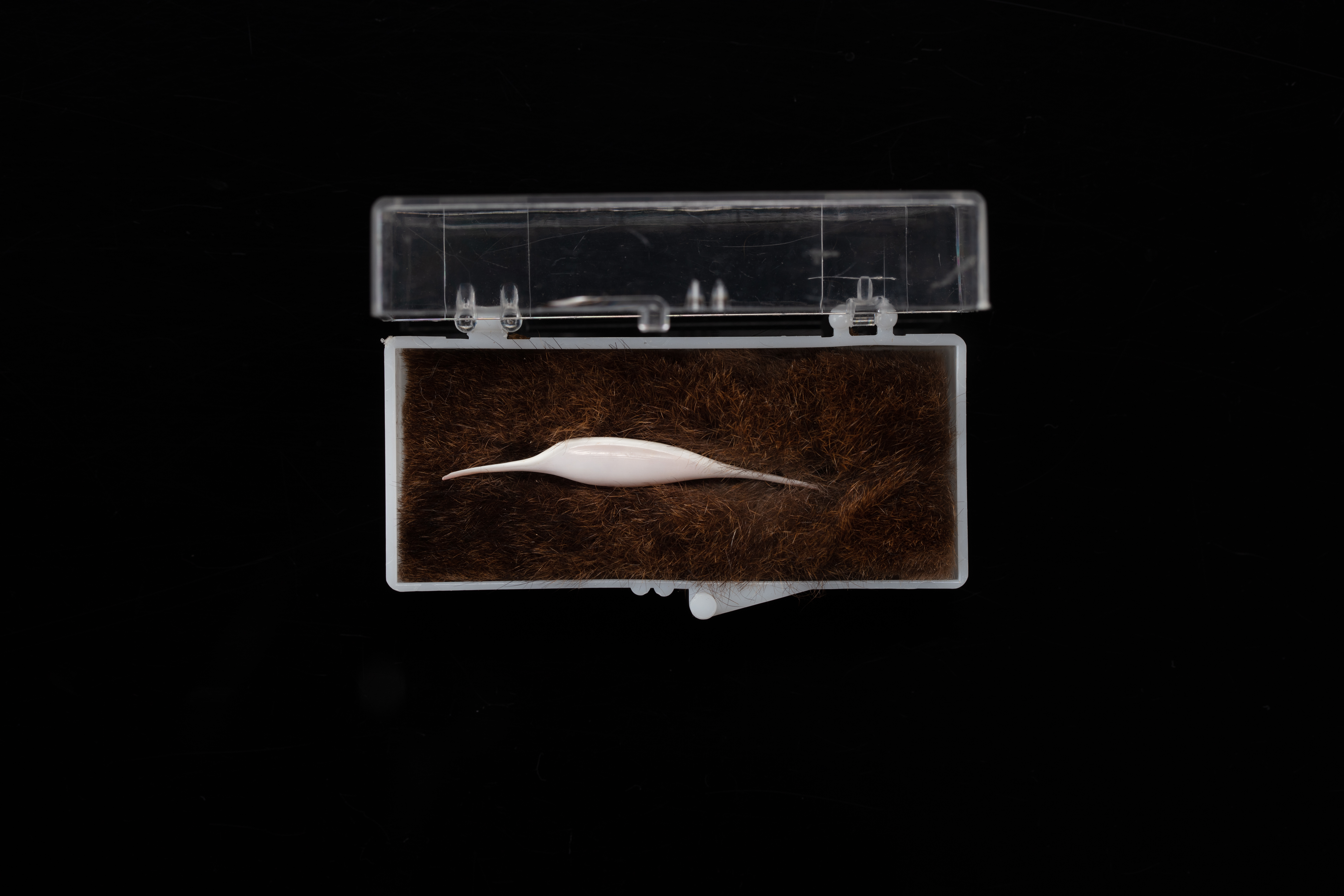

Scientific classification
- Kingdom: Animalia
- Phylum: Mollusca
- Class: Gastropoda
- Subclass: Caenogastropoda
- Order: Littorinimorpha
- Family: Ovulidae
- Genus: Kurodavolva
- Species: K. wakayamensis

Binomial name
- Kurodavolva wakayamensis (Cate & Azuma, 1973)

Synonyms
- Phenacovolva wakayamensis Cate & Azuma in Cate, 1973

= Kurodavolva wakayamensis =

Species of gastropod

Kurodavolva wakayamensis is a species of sea snail, a marine gastropod mollusk in the family Ovulidae, the ovulids, cowry allies or false cowries.
