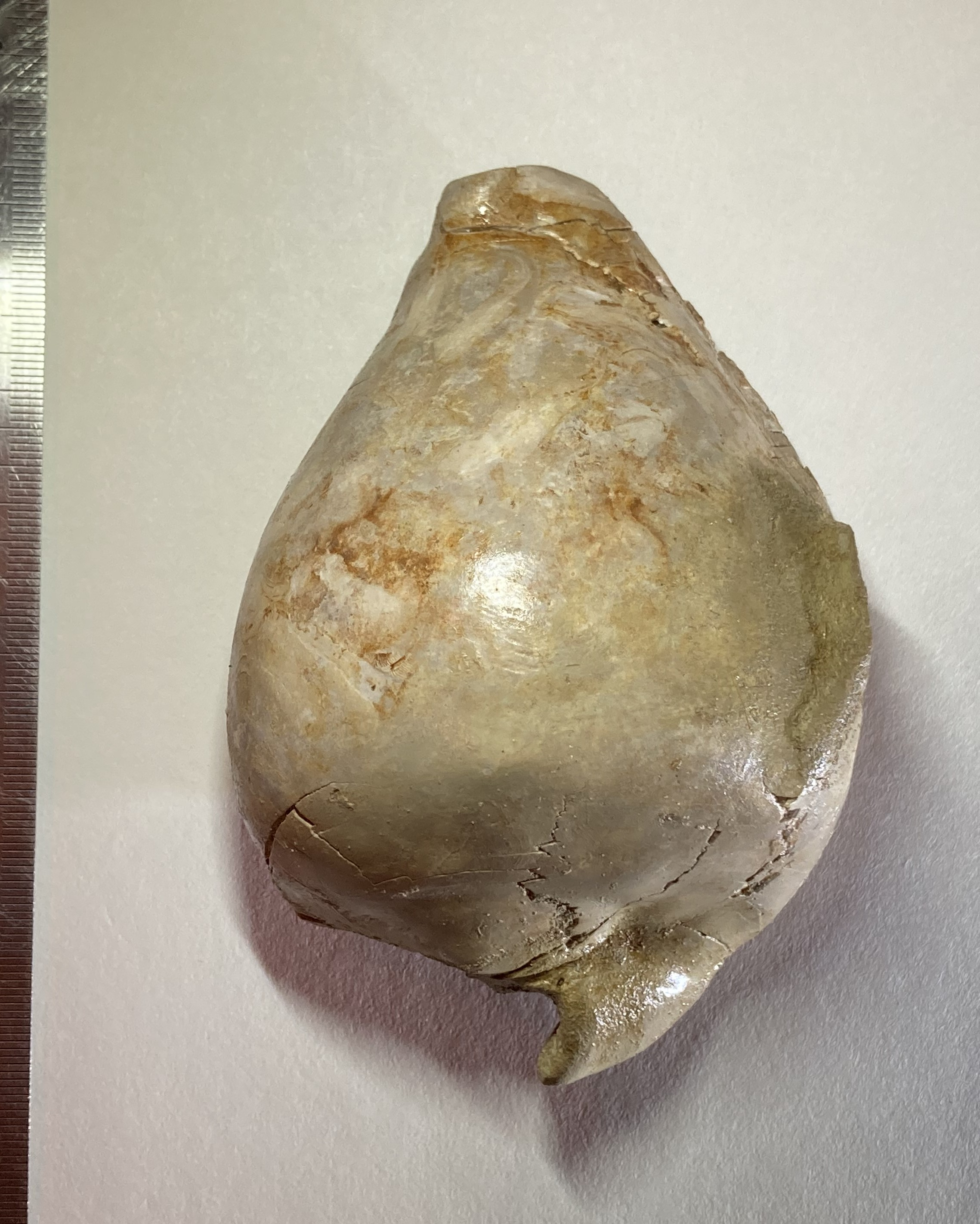
- Fossil Gisortia tuberculosa shell from Ypresian (Eocene) aged sediments in Gan, France

Scientific classification
- Kingdom: Animalia
- Phylum: Mollusca
- Class: Gastropoda
- Subclass: Caenogastropoda
- Order: Littorinimorpha
- Family: Cypraeidae
- Genus: †Gisortia; Jousseaume, 1884

Synonyms
- † Gisortia (Megalocypraea) F. A. Schilder, 1927 †; † Megalocypraea Schilder, 1927 †; † Megalocypraea F. A. Schilder, 1927 †; † Pseudogisortia Schilder, 1941

= Gisortia =

Extinct genus of gastropods

Gisortia is an extinct genus of cowries in the family Cypraeidae.

It had several members growing to large sizes (gigantism) and developing ornamentation, typically as tubercles, flanges, or processes. The genus was likely sister to Vicetia, which also developed very large species with ornamentation.

== Species ==
The number of species in the genus is currently unresolved, although two species, Gisortia coombii and Gisortia tuberculosa, are accepted.

These two species are restricted to the Ypresian and Lutetian ages of the Eocene in Western Europe. They have been hypothesized to be low-metabolism, grazing snails likely focusing on nutrition-poor sponges or algae as food. Their ornamentation may have been a defensive adaptation against predators.

According to WoRMS, the following species are accepted:

- † Gisortia brevis Douvillé, 1920
- † Gisortia clarki Ingram, 1940
- † Gisortia coombii (J. De C. Sowerby, 1850)
- † Gisortia tuberculosa (Duclos, 1825)
- † Gisortia chevallieri Cossmann, 1886 (taxon inquirendum)
- † Gisortia gigantea (Münster, 1841) (nomen dubium)

== Synonyms ==
- † Gisortia americana Schilder, 1930 synonym of † Gisortia tuberculosa (Duclos, 1825)(probable synonym)
- † Gisortia breviplicata F. A. Schilder, 1926 synonym of † Umbilia siphonata (Chapman, 1922) (junior subjective synonym)
- † Gisortia gennevauxi Doncieux, 1908 synonym of † Vicetia gennevauxi (Doncieux, 1908)(superseded combination)
- † Gisortia megaloptera Lorenz, 2017 synonym of † Gisortia coombii (J. De C. Sowerby, 1850 )
- † Gisortia taiwanensis Schilder, 1930 synonym of † Gisortia tuberculosa (Duclos, 1825)
- † Gisortia thomasi Olsson, 1930 synonym of † Gisortia tuberculosa (Duclos, 1825)
- † Gisortia vicetiana Farrés & Staid-Staadt, 2009 synonym of † Vicetia bellardii (Bellardi, 1852)
- † Gisortia vicetiformis Farrés & Staid-Staadt, 2009 † synonym of † Gisortia vicetiana Farrés & Staid-Staadt, 2009:synonym of † Vicetia bellardii (Bellardi, 1852) (alternative original spelling)
