= Simnia senegalensis =

Scientific classification
- Kingdom: Animalia
- Phylum: Mollusca
- Class: Gastropoda
- Subclass: Caenogastropoda
- Order: Littorinimorpha
- Family: Ovulidae
- Genus: Simnia
- Species: S. senegalensis

Binomial name
- Simnia senegalensis (Schilder, 1931)

Synonyms
- Neosimnia senegalensis Schilder, 1931

Species of gastropod

Simnia senegalensis is a species of sea snail, a marine gastropod mollusk in the family Ovulidae, the ovulids, cowry allies or false cowries.

== Distribution ==
This species occurs on the Atlantic coast of Africa (Cape Verde, Senegal, Gabon, Angola, São Tomé).
