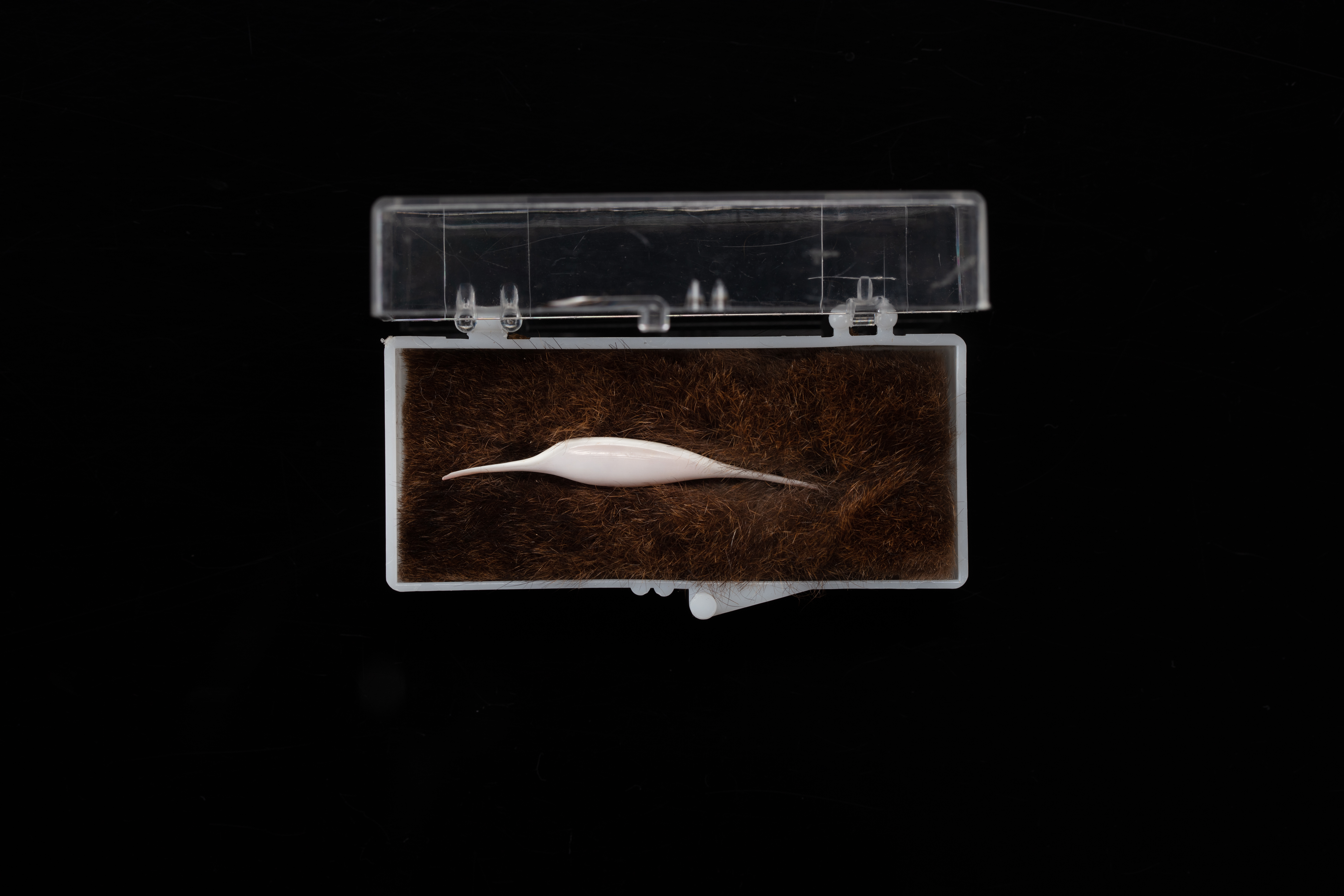

Scientific classification
- Kingdom: Animalia
- Phylum: Mollusca
- Class: Gastropoda
- Subclass: Caenogastropoda
- Order: Littorinimorpha
- Family: Ovulidae
- Subfamily: Ovulinae
- Genus: Kurodavolva; Azuma, 1987

= Kurodavolva =

Genus of gastropods

Kurodavolva is a genus of sea snails, marine gastropod mollusks in the family Ovulidae.

== Species ==
Species within the genus Kurodavolva include:

- Kurodavolva wakayamensis (Cate & Azuma, 1973)
