= Simnia arcuata =

Scientific classification
- Kingdom: Animalia
- Phylum: Mollusca
- Class: Gastropoda
- Subclass: Caenogastropoda
- Order: Littorinimorpha
- Family: Ovulidae
- Genus: Simnia
- Species: S. arcuata

Binomial name
- Simnia arcuata (Reeve, 1865)

Synonyms
- Delonovolva aequalis vidleri (G. B. Sowerby III, 1881) ·; Neosimnia arcuata (Reeve, 1865) (basionym); Neosimnia quaylei Lowe, H.N., 1935; Neosimnia tyrianthina Berry, S.S., 1960; Neosimnia vidleri Sowerby III, 1881; Ovulum arcuatum Reeve, 1865 (original combination); Ovulum neglectum Reeve, 1865; Ovulum vidleri G. B. Sowerby III, 1881; Pseudocyphoma gibbulum Cate, C.N., 1978; Simnia vidleri (G. B. Sowerby III, 1881) junior subjective synonym; Spiculata advena Cate, C.N., 1978

Species of gastropod

Simnia arcuata, common name Vidler's simnia, is a species of sea snail, a marine gastropod mollusk in the family Ovulidae, the ovulids, cowry allies or false cowries.

== Description ==
The size of an adult shell varies between 8 mm and 26 mm.

== Distribution ==
This species occurs in the Pacific Ocean off the Galapagos Islands and from California to Peru.
