= Takasagovolva gigantea =

Scientific classification
- Kingdom: Animalia
- Phylum: Mollusca
- Class: Gastropoda
- Subclass: Caenogastropoda
- Order: Littorinimorpha
- Family: Ovulidae
- Genus: Takasagovolva
- Species: T. gigantea

Binomial name
- Takasagovolva gigantea Azuma, 1974

Species of gastropod

Takasagovolva gigantea is a species of sea snail, a marine gastropod mollusc in the family Ovulidae, the ovulids, cowry allies or false cowries.
