= Takasagovolva honkakujiana =

Scientific classification
- Kingdom: Animalia
- Phylum: Mollusca
- Class: Gastropoda
- Subclass: Caenogastropoda
- Order: Littorinimorpha
- Family: Ovulidae
- Genus: Takasagovolva
- Species: T. honkakujiana

Binomial name
- Takasagovolva honkakujiana (Kuroda, 1928)

Synonyms
- Phenacovolva honkakujiana (Kuroda, 1928); Radius honkakujiana Kuroda, 1928

Species of gastropod

Takasagovolva honkakujiana is a species of sea snail, a marine gastropod mollusc in the family Ovulidae, the ovulids, cowry allies or false cowries.
