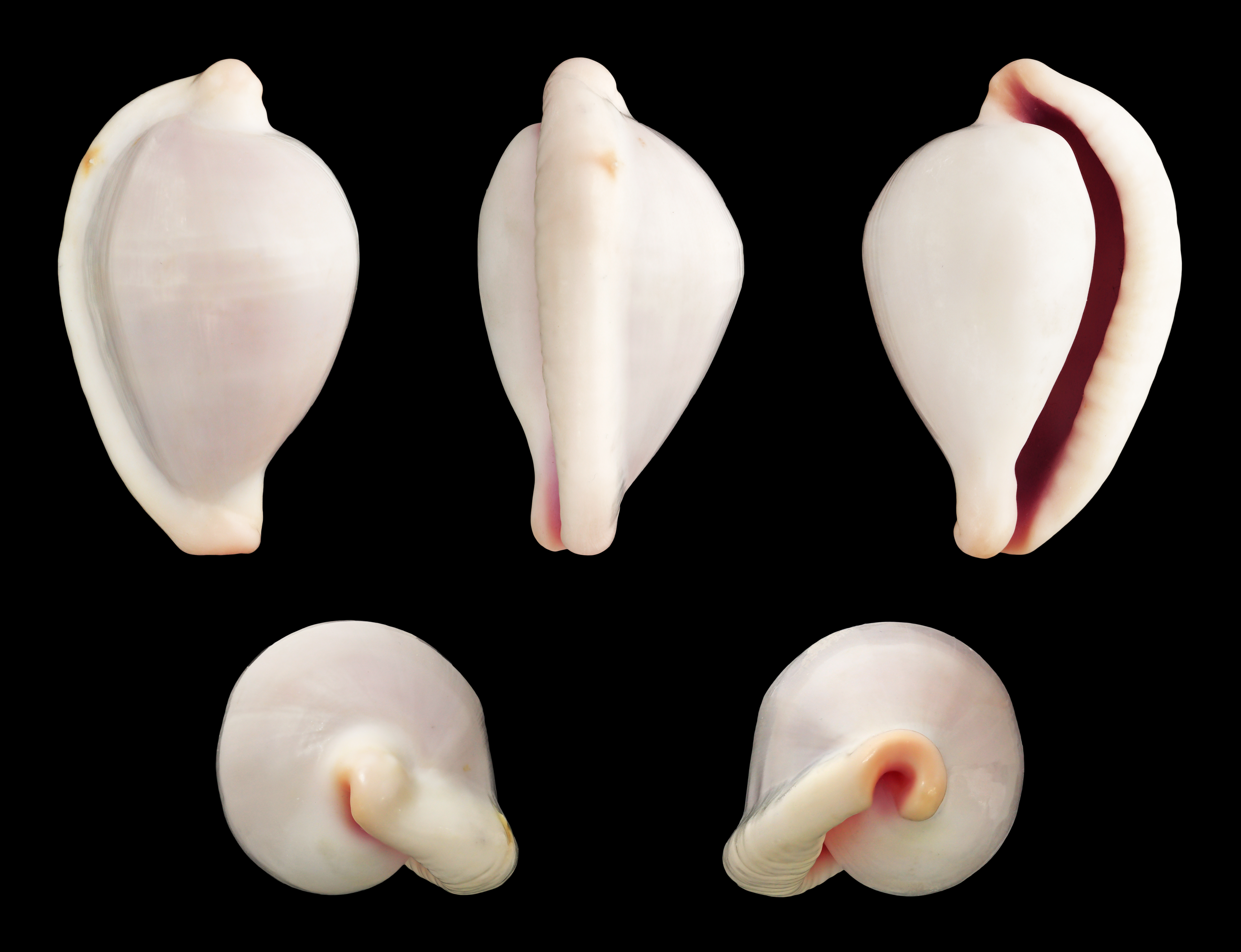

Scientific classification
- Kingdom: Animalia
- Phylum: Mollusca
- Class: Gastropoda
- Subclass: Caenogastropoda
- Order: Littorinimorpha
- Family: Ovulidae
- Genus: Ovula
- Species: O. costellata

Binomial name
- Ovula costellata Lamarck, 1810

Synonyms
- Bulla imperialis Solander, 1786; Ovula angulosa Lamarck, 1822; Ovula columba Schubert & Wagner, 1829; Ovula tortilis Deshayes, 1844

= Ovula costellata =

Species of gastropod

Ovula costellata is a species of sea snail, a marine gastropod mollusc in the family Ovulidae, the ovulids, cowry allies or false cowries.

== Description ==
Commonly known as the Pink-Mouth eggshell, this relatively small snail attains a shell size of 50mm.

== Distribution ==
Ovula costellata has a tropical to subtropical distribution range, from East Africa to the Western Pacific and New Zealand's Kermadec islands.
