= Ovula ishibashii =

Scientific classification
- Kingdom: Animalia
- Phylum: Mollusca
- Class: Gastropoda
- Subclass: Caenogastropoda
- Order: Littorinimorpha
- Family: Ovulidae
- Genus: Ovula
- Species: O. ishibashii

Binomial name
- Ovula ishibashii (Kuroda, 1928)

Synonyms
- Amphiperas isibasii Kuroda, 1928

Species of gastropod

Ovula ishibashii is a species of sea snail, a marine gastropod mollusk in the family Ovulidae, the ovulids, cowry allies or false cowries.

== Description ==
Shell size 24 mm.

== Distribution ==
Philippines.
