= Simnia barbarensis =

Scientific classification
- Kingdom: Animalia
- Phylum: Mollusca
- Class: Gastropoda
- Subclass: Caenogastropoda
- Order: Littorinimorpha
- Family: Ovulidae
- Genus: Simnia
- Species: S. barbarensis

Binomial name
- Simnia barbarensis Dall, 1892

Synonyms
- Neosimnia barbarensis (Dall, 1892)

Species of gastropod

Simnia barbarensis is a species of sea snail, a marine gastropod mollusk in the family Ovulidae, the ovulids, cowry allies or false cowries.
