= Xandarovula aperta =

Scientific classification
- Kingdom: Animalia
- Phylum: Mollusca
- Class: Gastropoda
- Subclass: Caenogastropoda
- Order: Littorinimorpha
- Family: Ovulidae
- Genus: Xandarovula
- Species: X. aperta

Binomial name
- Xandarovula aperta (Sowerby II, 1949)

Synonyms
- Simnia aperta (Sowerby II, 1848)

Species of gastropod

Xandarovula aperta is a species of sea snail, a marine gastropod mollusk in the family Ovulidae, the ovulids, cowry allies or false cowries.
