= Takasagovolva =

Scientific classification
- Kingdom: Animalia
- Phylum: Mollusca
- Class: Gastropoda
- Subclass: Caenogastropoda
- Order: Littorinimorpha
- Family: Ovulidae
- Subfamily: Ovulinae
- Genus: Takasagovolva; Azuma, 1974

Genus of gastropods

Takasagovolva is a genus of sea snails, marine gastropod molluscs in the family Ovulidae.

== Species ==
Species within the genus Takasagovolva include:

- Takasagovolva gigantea Azuma, 1974
- Takasagovolva honkakujiana (Kuroda, 1928)
