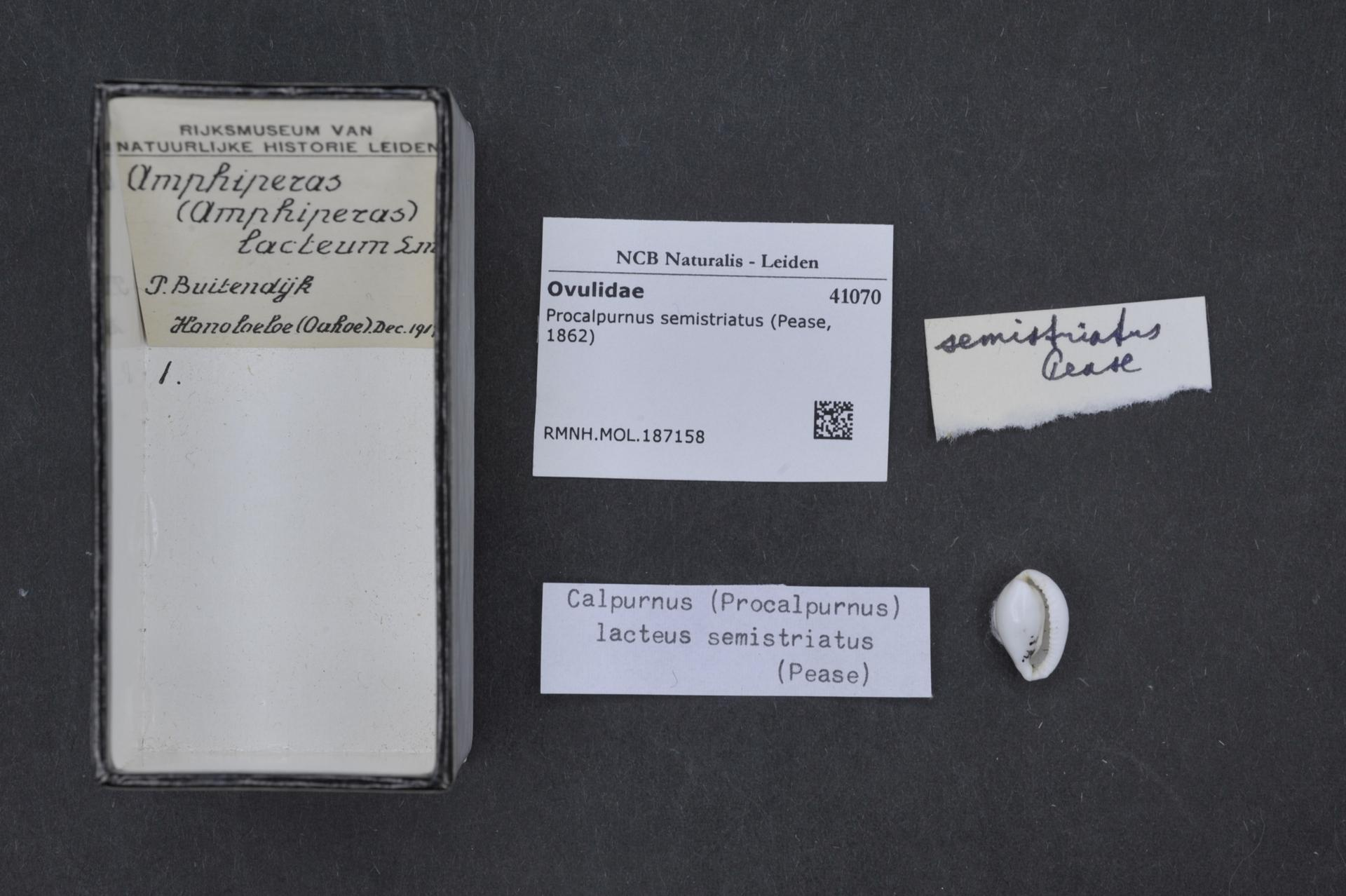

Scientific classification
- Kingdom: Animalia
- Phylum: Mollusca
- Class: Gastropoda
- Subclass: Caenogastropoda
- Order: Littorinimorpha
- Family: Ovulidae
- Genus: Procalpurnus
- Species: P. semistriatus

Binomial name
- Procalpurnus semistriatus (Pease, 1862)

Synonyms
- Amphiperas semistriata Pease, 1862; Calpurnus lacteus semistriatus Schilder, 1941; Ovula adamsi Weinkauff, 1881; Primovula concinna Schilder, 1932; Procalpurnus adamsii (Reeve, 1865)

= Procalpurnus semistriatus =

Species of gastropod

Procalpurnus semistriatus is a species of sea snail, a marine gastropod mollusk in the family Ovulidae, the ovulids, cowry allies or false cowries.
