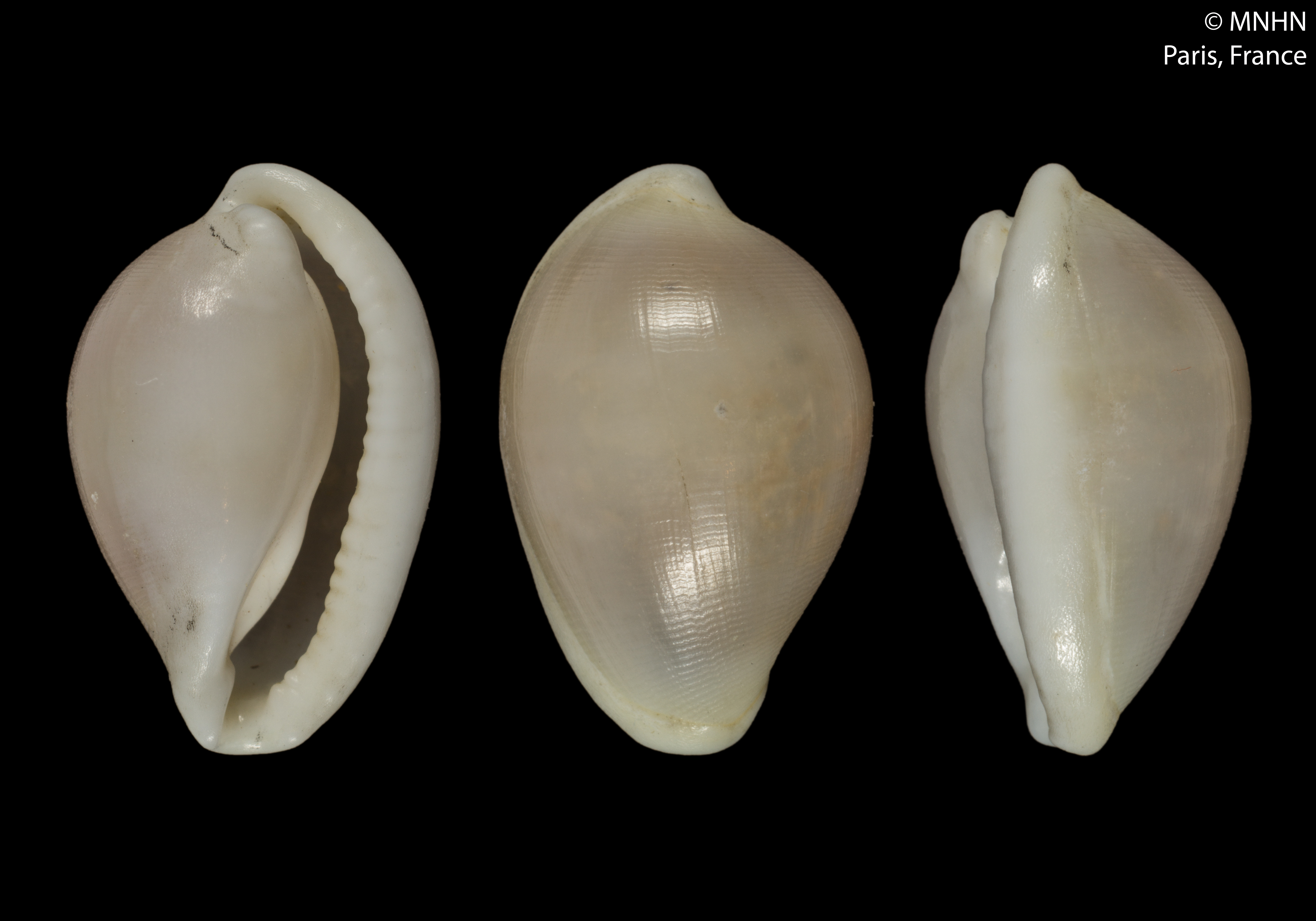
- Shell of Diminovula caledonica (syntype at MNHN, Paris)

Scientific classification
- Kingdom: Animalia
- Phylum: Mollusca
- Class: Gastropoda
- Subclass: Caenogastropoda
- Order: Littorinimorpha
- Family: Ovulidae
- Genus: Diminovula
- Species: D. caledonica

Binomial name
- Diminovula caledonica (Crosse, 1872)

Synonyms
- Ovula caldeonica Crosse, 1872; Ovula pudica sensu Tryon, 1885 not A. Adams, 1855; Pseudosimnia caledonica (Crosse, 1872)

= Diminovula caledonica =

Species of gastropod

Diminovula caledonica is a species of sea snail in the family Ovulidae, the ovulids, cowry allies or false cowries.

== Description ==
The length of the shell attains 13.4 mm.

== Distribution ==
This marine species occurs off New Caledonia.
