= Simnia loebbeckeana =

Scientific classification
- Kingdom: Animalia
- Phylum: Mollusca
- Class: Gastropoda
- Subclass: Caenogastropoda
- Order: Littorinimorpha
- Family: Ovulidae
- Genus: Simnia
- Species: S. loebbeckeana

Binomial name
- Simnia loebbeckeana (Weinkauff, 1881)

Synonyms
- Neosimnia loebbeckeana (Weinkauff, 1881)

Species of gastropod

Simnia loebbeckeana is a species of sea snail, a marine gastropod mollusk in the family Ovulidae, the ovulids, cowry allies or false cowries.
