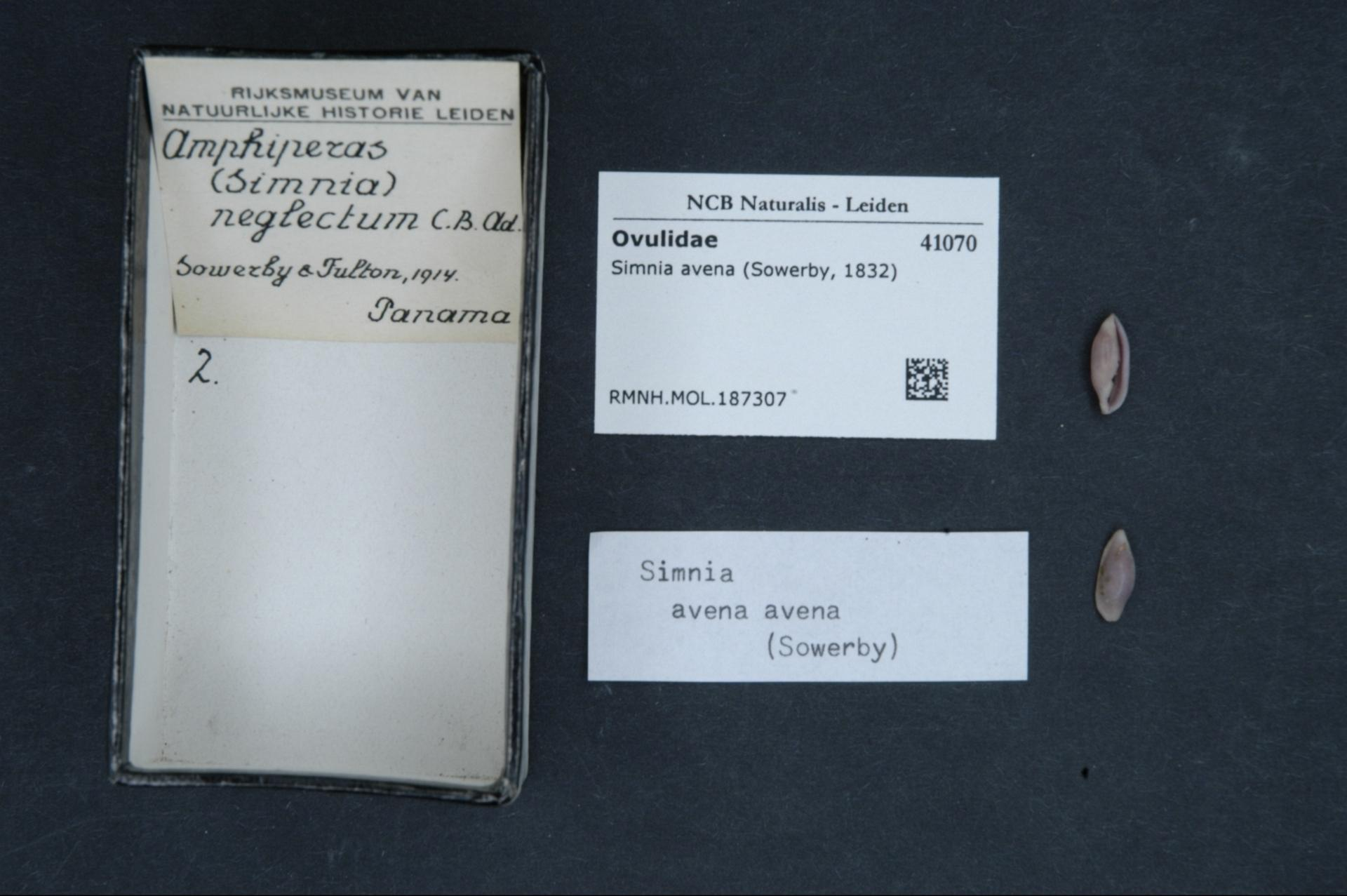
- Simnia avena

Scientific classification
- Kingdom: Animalia
- Phylum: Mollusca
- Class: Gastropoda
- Subclass: Caenogastropoda
- Order: Littorinimorpha
- Family: Ovulidae
- Genus: Simnia
- Species: S. avena

Binomial name
- Simnia avena (Sowerby II, 1832)

Synonyms
- Neosimnia avena (Sowerby II, 1832)

= Simnia avena =

Species of gastropod

Simnia avena is a species of sea snail, a marine gastropod mollusk in the family Ovulidae, the ovulids, cowry allies or false cowries.
