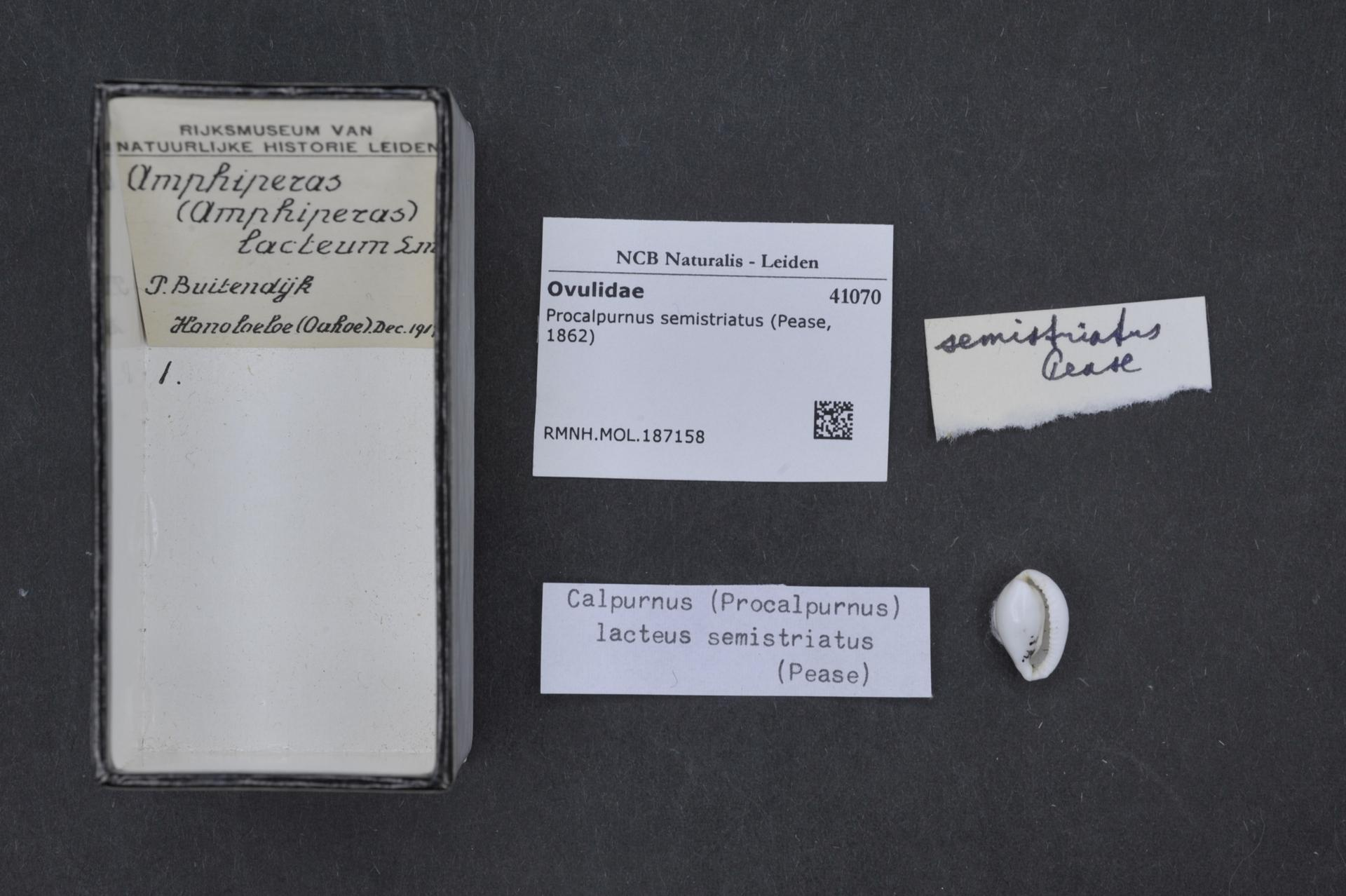
- Procalpurnus semistriatus

Scientific classification
- Kingdom: Animalia
- Phylum: Mollusca
- Class: Gastropoda
- Subclass: Caenogastropoda
- Order: Littorinimorpha
- Family: Ovulidae
- Genus: Procalpurnus; Thiele, 1939

= Procalpurnus =

Genus of gastropods

Procalpurnus is a genus of sea snails, marine gastropod mollusks in the family Ovulidae.

== Species ==
Species within the genus Procalpurnus include:

- Procalpurnus lacteus (Lamarck, 1810)
- Procalpurnus semistriatus (Pease, 1862)

Species brought into synonymy

- Procalpurnus adamsii (Reeve, 1865): synonym of Procalpurnus semistriatus (Pease, 1863)
