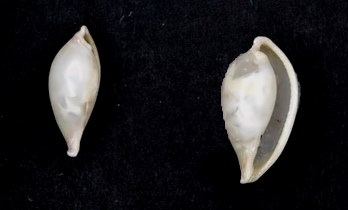
- Two views of a shell of Pseudosimnia adriatica (museum specimens at Naturalis Biodiversity Center)

Scientific classification
- Kingdom: Animalia
- Phylum: Mollusca
- Class: Gastropoda
- Subclass: Caenogastropoda
- Order: Littorinimorpha
- Family: Ovulidae
- Genus: Pseudosimnia
- Species: P. adriatica

Binomial name
- Pseudosimnia adriatica (Sowerby I, 1828)

Synonyms
- Aperiovula adriatica adriatica Sowerby I, 1828; Aperiovula adriatica adriatica Sowerby I, 1828; Aperiovula adriatica iberia Cate, 1973; Aperiovula emersoni Cate, 1973; Bulla virginea Cantraine, 1835; Ovula elongata Requien, 1848; Ovula haliotidea Blainville, 1825; Ovula oblongata Blainville, 1848; Ovulum adriaticum Sowerby I, 1828; Primovula adriatica Allan, 1956; Pseudosimnia adriatica Schilder, 1941

= Pseudosimnia adriatica =

Species of gastropod

Pseudosimnia adriatica, common name the Adriatic egg shell, is a species of sea snail, a marine gastropod mollusk in the family Ovulidae, the ovulids, cowry allies or false cowries.

== Description ==
The size of the shell varies between 15 and 28 mm (0.59 and 1.10 in).

== Distribution ==
This marine species occurs in the Western Mediterranean and in the adjacent Atlantic Ocean.
