= Procalpurnus lacteus =

Scientific classification
- Kingdom: Animalia
- Phylum: Mollusca
- Class: Gastropoda
- Subclass: Caenogastropoda
- Order: Littorinimorpha
- Family: Ovulidae
- Genus: Procalpurnus
- Species: P. lacteus

Binomial name
- Procalpurnus lacteus (Lamarck, 1810)

Synonyms
- Calpurnus lacteus Lamarck, 1810; Ovula lactea Lamarck, 1810; Ovula lactea Paetel, 1887; Ovulum album Dufo, 1840

Species of gastropod

Procalpurnus lacteus is a species of sea snail, a marine gastropod mollusk in the family Ovulidae, the ovulids, cowry allies or false cowries.
