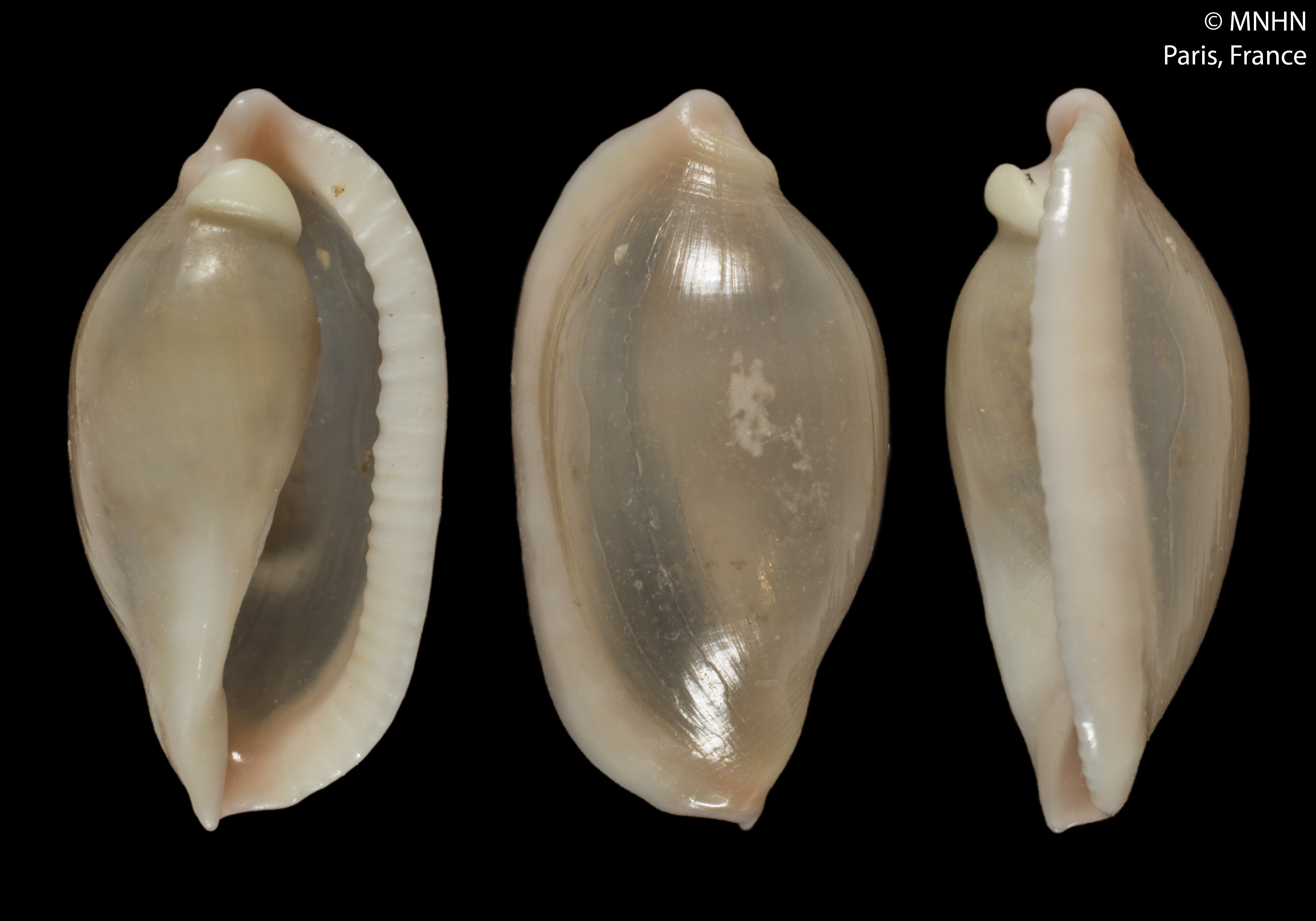
- Shell of Sandalia triticea (holotype at MNHN, Paris)

Scientific classification
- Kingdom: Animalia
- Phylum: Mollusca
- Class: Gastropoda
- Subclass: Caenogastropoda
- Order: Littorinimorpha
- Family: Ovulidae
- Genus: Sandalia
- Species: S. triticea

Binomial name
- Sandalia triticea (Lamarck, 1810)

Synonyms
- Amphiperas rhodia A. Adams, 1854; Amphiperas scitula A. Adams, 1854; Birostra rhodia (A. Adams, 1854); Ovula bullata sensu Tryon, 1885 not A. Adams & Reeve, 1848; Ovula rhodia (A. Adams, 1854); Ovula triticea Lamarck, 1810; Ovulum rhodium (A. Adams, 1854); Primovula (Primovula) rhodia (A. Adams, 1854); Primovula (Sandalia) triticea (Lamarck, 1810); Primovula fumikoae Azuma & Cate, 1971; Primovula rhodia Allan, 1956; Primovula rhodia sensu J. Allan, 1956 not A. Adams, 1854; Pseudosimnia carnea sensu F. A. Schilder, 1941 not Poiret, 1789; Sandalia bridgesi Lorenz, 2009 junior subjective synonym; Sandalia pontia Cate, 1975; Stohleroma asiaticum Cate, 1973

= Sandalia triticea =

Species of gastropod

Sandalia triticea is a species of sea snail, a marine gastropod mollusk in the family Ovulidae, the ovulids, cowry allies or false cowries.
