= Xandarovula hyalina =

Scientific classification
- Kingdom: Animalia
- Phylum: Mollusca
- Class: Gastropoda
- Subclass: Caenogastropoda
- Order: Littorinimorpha
- Family: Ovulidae
- Genus: Xandarovula
- Species: X. hyalina

Binomial name
- Xandarovula hyalina (Lorenz & Fehse, 2009)

Synonyms
- Simnia hyalina Lorenz & Fehse, 2009

Species of gastropod

Xandarovula hyalina is a species of sea snail, a marine gastropod mollusk in the family Ovulidae, the ovulids, cowry allies or false cowries.
