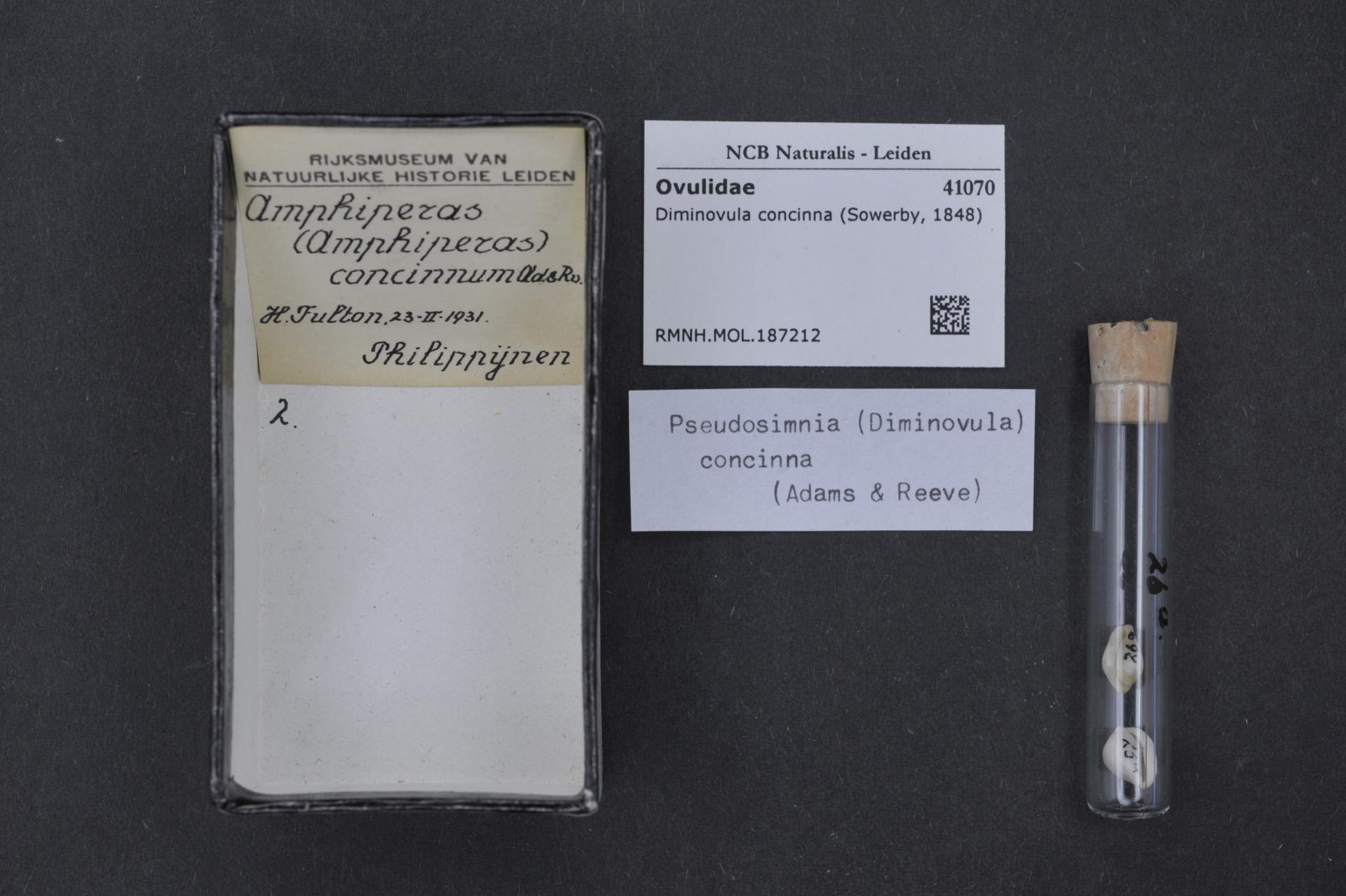
- A diminovula concinna sample collected in 1848

Scientific classification
- Kingdom: Animalia
- Phylum: Mollusca
- Class: Gastropoda
- Subclass: Caenogastropoda
- Order: Littorinimorpha
- Family: Ovulidae
- Genus: Diminovula
- Species: D. concinna

Binomial name
- Diminovula concinna (Sowerby II in A. Adams & Reeve, 1848)

Synonyms
- Ovula cumingi Moerch, 1850; Ovula margarita A. Adams, 1854

= Diminovula concinna =

Species of gastropod

Diminovula concinna is a species of sea snail in the family Ovulidae, the ovulids, cowry allies or false cowries.
