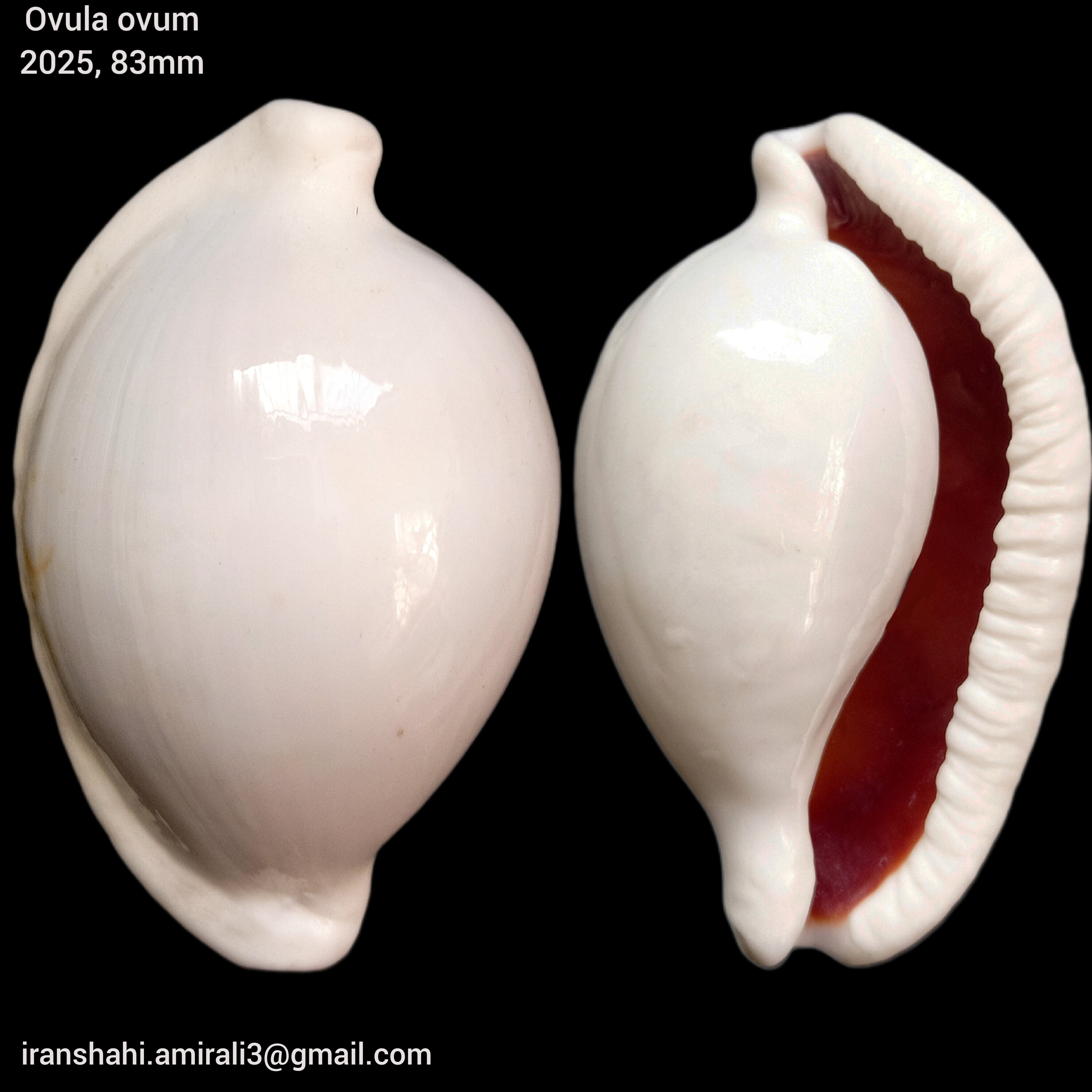

Scientific classification
- Kingdom: Animalia
- Phylum: Mollusca
- Class: Gastropoda
- Subclass: Caenogastropoda
- Order: Littorinimorpha
- Family: Ovulidae
- Genus: Ovula
- Species: O. ovum

Binomial name
- Ovula ovum (Linnaeus, 1758)

Synonyms
- Amphiperas ovum (Linnaeus, 1758); Bulla ovum Linnaeus, 1758; Ovula alba Perry, 1811; Ovula cygnea Röding, 1798; Ovula oviformis Lamarck, 1801; Ovula pygmaea Sowerby I, 1828; Ovulum gallinaceum Reeve, 1860; Xandarovula figgisae Cate, 1973

= Ovula ovum =

Species of gastropod

Ovula ovum, common name the common egg cowrie, is a species of sea snail, a marine gastropod mollusk in the family Ovulidae, the ovulids, cowry allies or false cowries.

== Description ==
The shells of these quite common cowries reach on average 65–70 millimetres (2.6–2.8 in) of length, with a minimum size of 50 millimetres (2.0 in) and a maximum size of 120 millimetres (4.7 in). They are egg-shaped (hence the Latin name ovum, meaning egg). The surface of the shell is smooth, shiny and completely snow white, with a dark reddish-purple interior, visible through the wide and long aperture, which bears teeth on one side only. In the living cowries the mantle is black, with a pattern of small white spots in adults, while juveniles resemble some toxic nudibranchs of the genus Phyllidia owing to their orange yellow sensorial papillae. The lateral flaps of the mantle usually hide completely the white surface, but the mantle is quickly retracted into the shell opening when the cowry is disturbed.

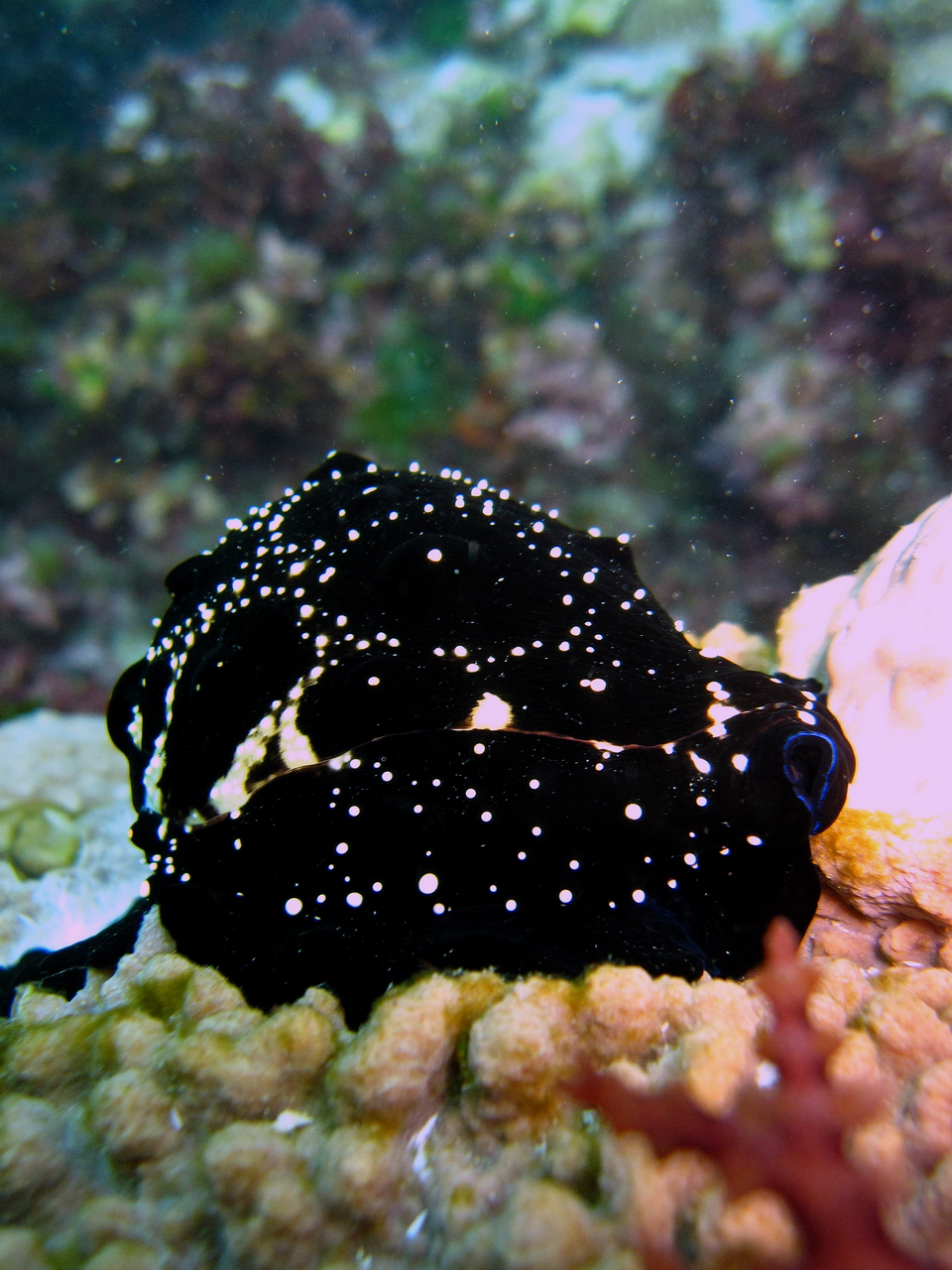
Ovula ovum with whole body covered by its mantle. This species can be easily found in the nearshore water of northeast coast of Taiwan.

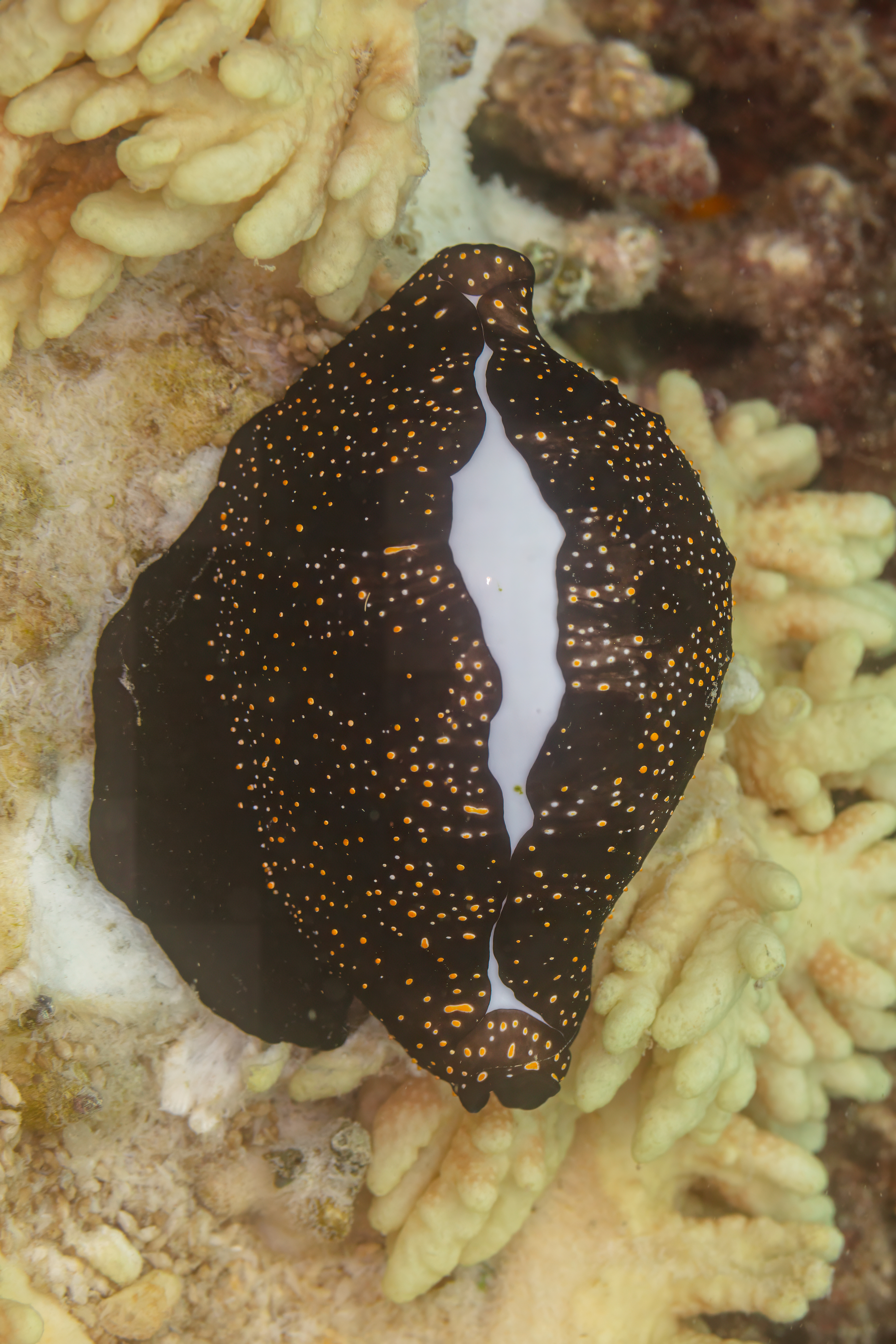
Exemplar from Zanzibar (Tanzania).

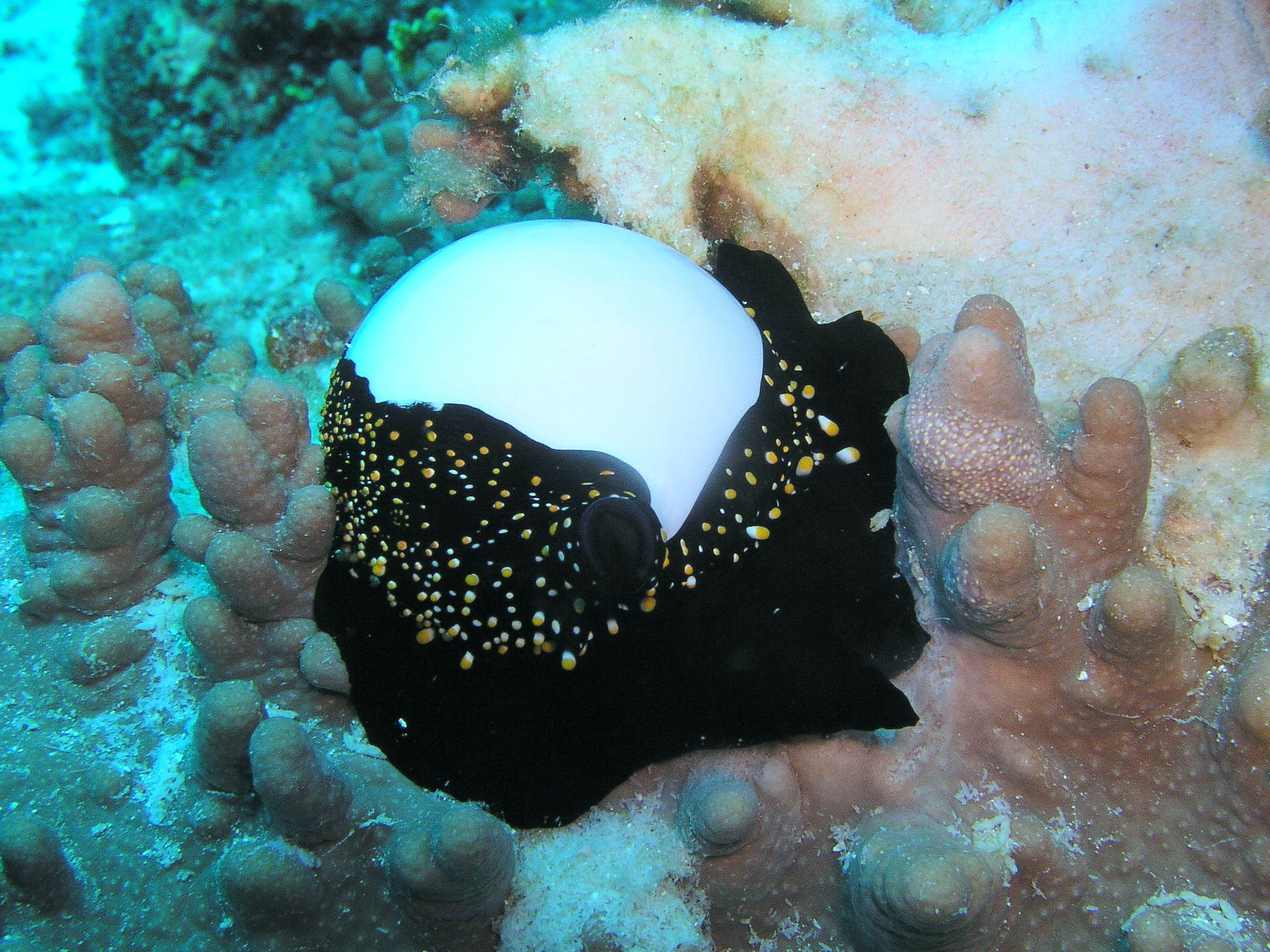
Juvenile Ovula ovum with orange yellow papillae looks like a toxic nudibranch Phyllidia sp.

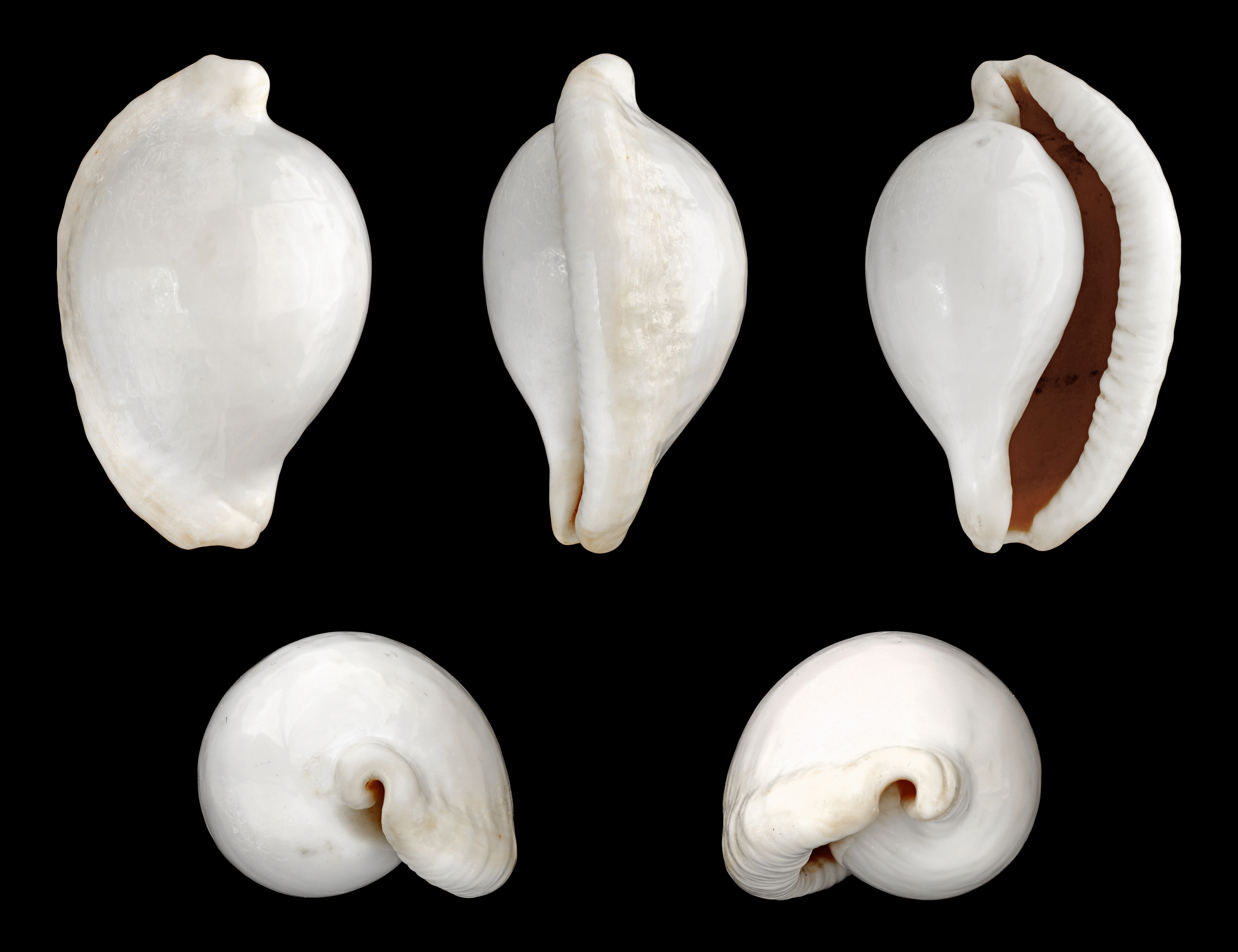
A shell of Ovula ovum.

== Distribution ==
This species is distributed in the Red Sea and in the Indian Ocean along East Africa (Aldabra, Madagascar, Mozambique, Mauritius, Tanzania, Kenya, Chagos) and in Western and Central Pacific Ocean (New Zealand, Australia, North Sulawesi, Malaysia, Borneo, New Caledonia, Philippines, French Polynesia and southern Japan).

== Habitat ==
Ovula ovum lives in tropical reef in shallow waters at 2 to 20 metres (7 to 66 ft) of depth, usually on algae or soft corals, mainly feeding on Alcyonarian colonies (Leather Coral, genus Sarcophyton and Sinularia sp., Alcyoniidae).

== Feeding ==
Ovula ovum feeds on soft corals of the genus Sarcophyton, despite them containing the toxic terpene macrolide sarcophytoxide. O. ovum probably detoxifies sarcophytoxide in the intestines.
