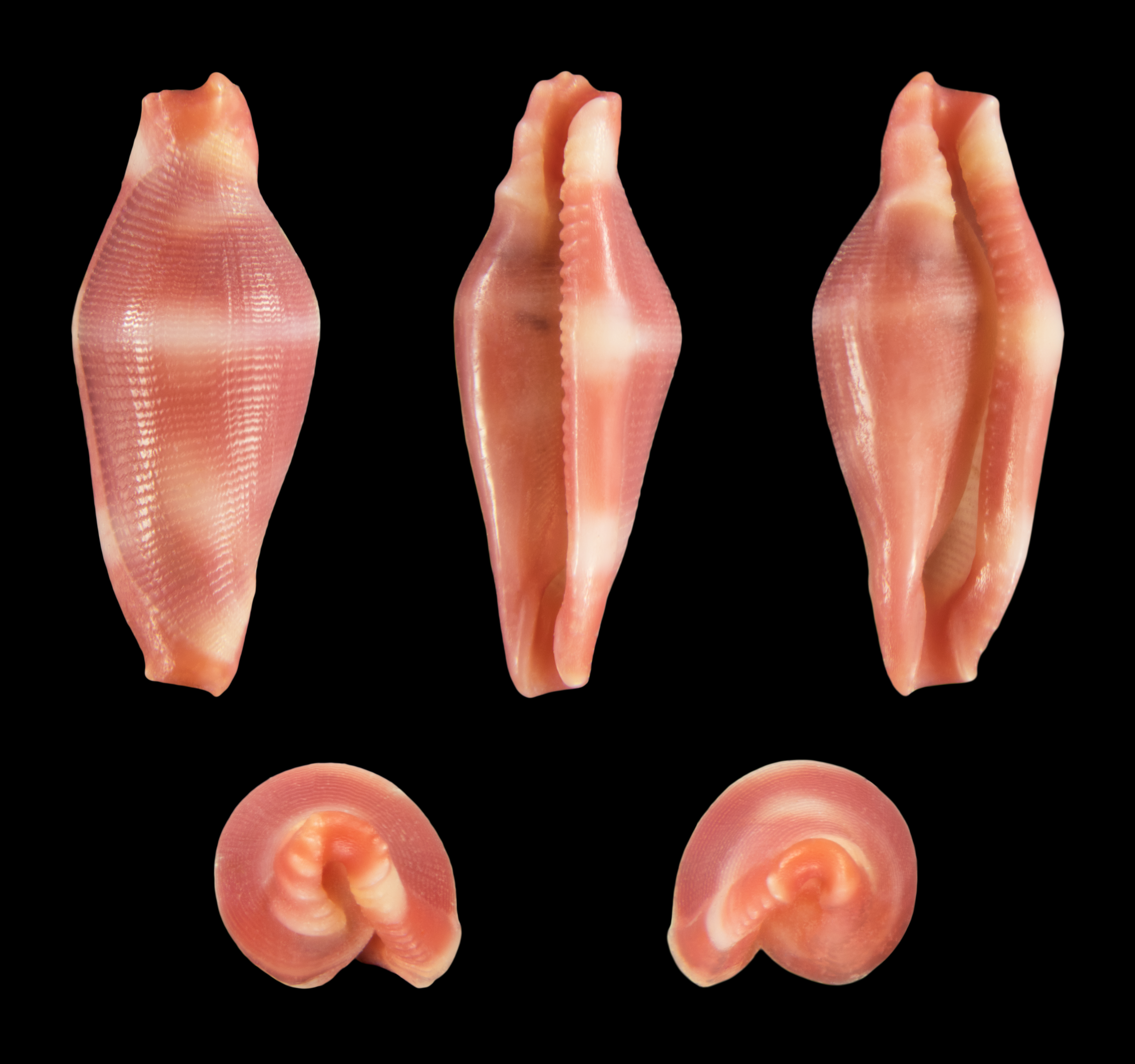

Scientific classification
- Kingdom: Animalia
- Phylum: Mollusca
- Class: Gastropoda
- Subclass: Caenogastropoda
- Order: Littorinimorpha
- Family: Ovulidae
- Genus: Crenavolva
- Species: C. striatula

Binomial name
- Crenavolva striatula (Sowerby I, 1828)

Synonyms
- Dentiovula takeoi Cate & Azuma in Cate, 1973; Ovula nigerina Dufo, 1840; Ovula tuberculosa Gray & Sowerby II, 1839; Ovulum striatulum Sowerby I, 1828

= Crenavolva striatula =

Species of gastropod

Crenavolva striatula is a species of sea snail, a marine gastropod mollusk in the family Ovulidae, the ovulids, cowry allies or false cowries.
