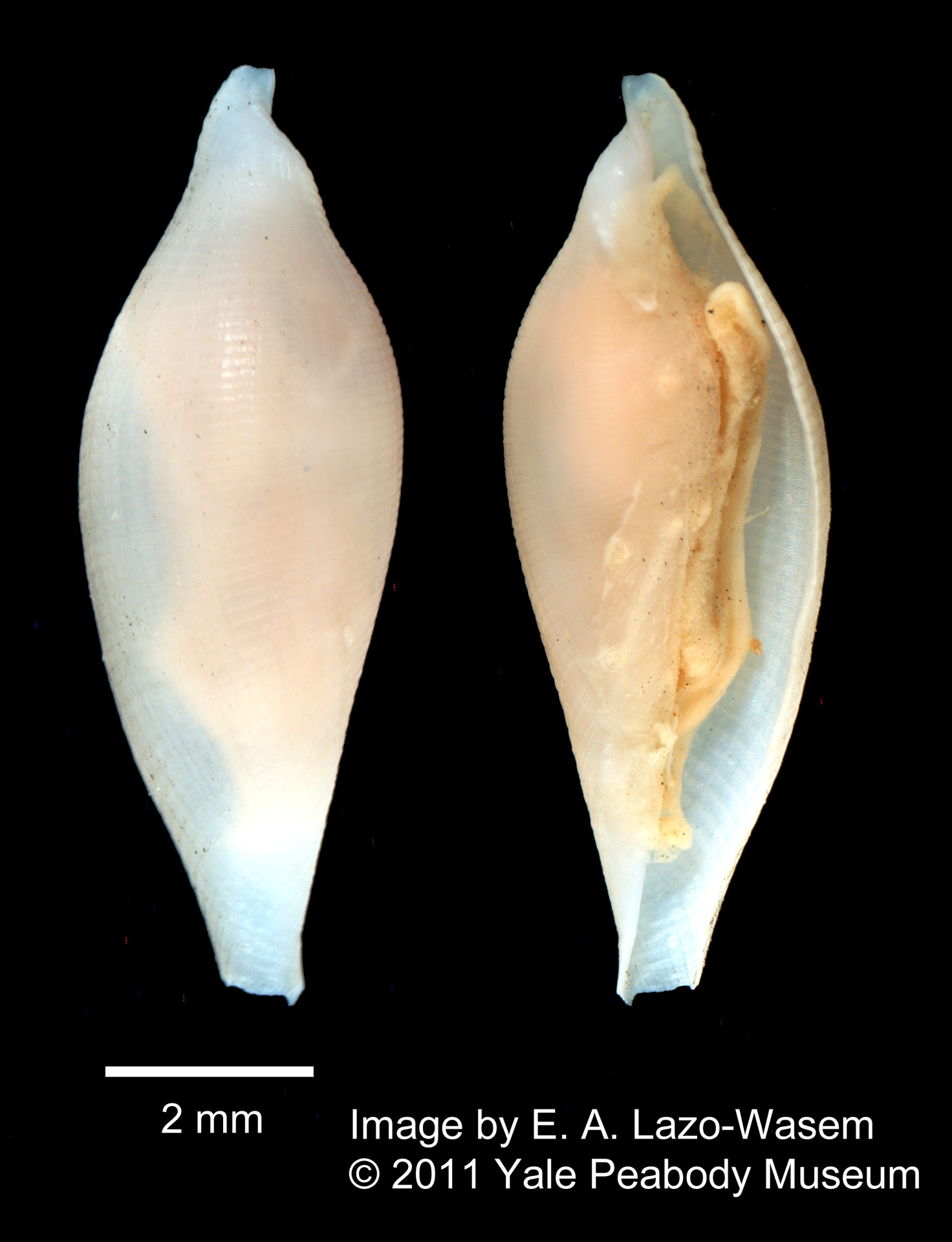

Scientific classification
- Kingdom: Animalia
- Phylum: Mollusca
- Class: Gastropoda
- Subclass: Caenogastropoda
- Order: Littorinimorpha
- Family: Ovulidae
- Genus: Simnialena
- Species: S. rufa

Binomial name
- Simnialena rufa (Sowerby II, 1832)

Synonyms
- Cymbovula bratcherae Cate, 1973; Ovulum californicum Reeve, 1865; Ovulum inflexum Sowerby II, 1832; Ovulum rufum Sowerby II, 1832; Ovulum variabile Reeve, 1865; Simnia inflexa Schilder, 1941; Simnia rufa (Sowerby II, 1832)

= Simnialena rufa =

Species of gastropod

Simnialena rufa is a species of sea snail, a marine gastropod mollusk in the family Ovulidae, the ovulids, cowry allies or false cowries.
