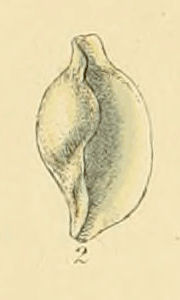
- Xandarovula patula shell

Scientific classification
- Kingdom: Animalia
- Phylum: Mollusca
- Class: Gastropoda
- Subclass: Caenogastropoda
- Order: Littorinimorpha
- Family: Ovulidae
- Genus: Simnia
- Species: S. patula

Binomial name
- Simnia patula (Pennant, 1777)

Synonyms
- Bulla patula Pennant, 1777; Xandarovula patula (Pennant, 1777)

= Simnia patula =

Species of gastropod

Simnia patula is a species of sea snail, a marine gastropod mollusk in the family Ovulidae, the ovulids, cowry allies or false cowries.

== Features ==
- It is up to 0,8 cm in diameter and 2 cm in length.
- Small, shiny, oval-shell, convoluted.
- The elongated oval aperture is narrower than the rest of the shell, with flared lips.
- A shell that is white, yellow or pinkish.
- With brown stripes and spots mainly on the mantle, the body is yellow.
- The mantle has two flaps which, when the animal is active, cover the mantle.
