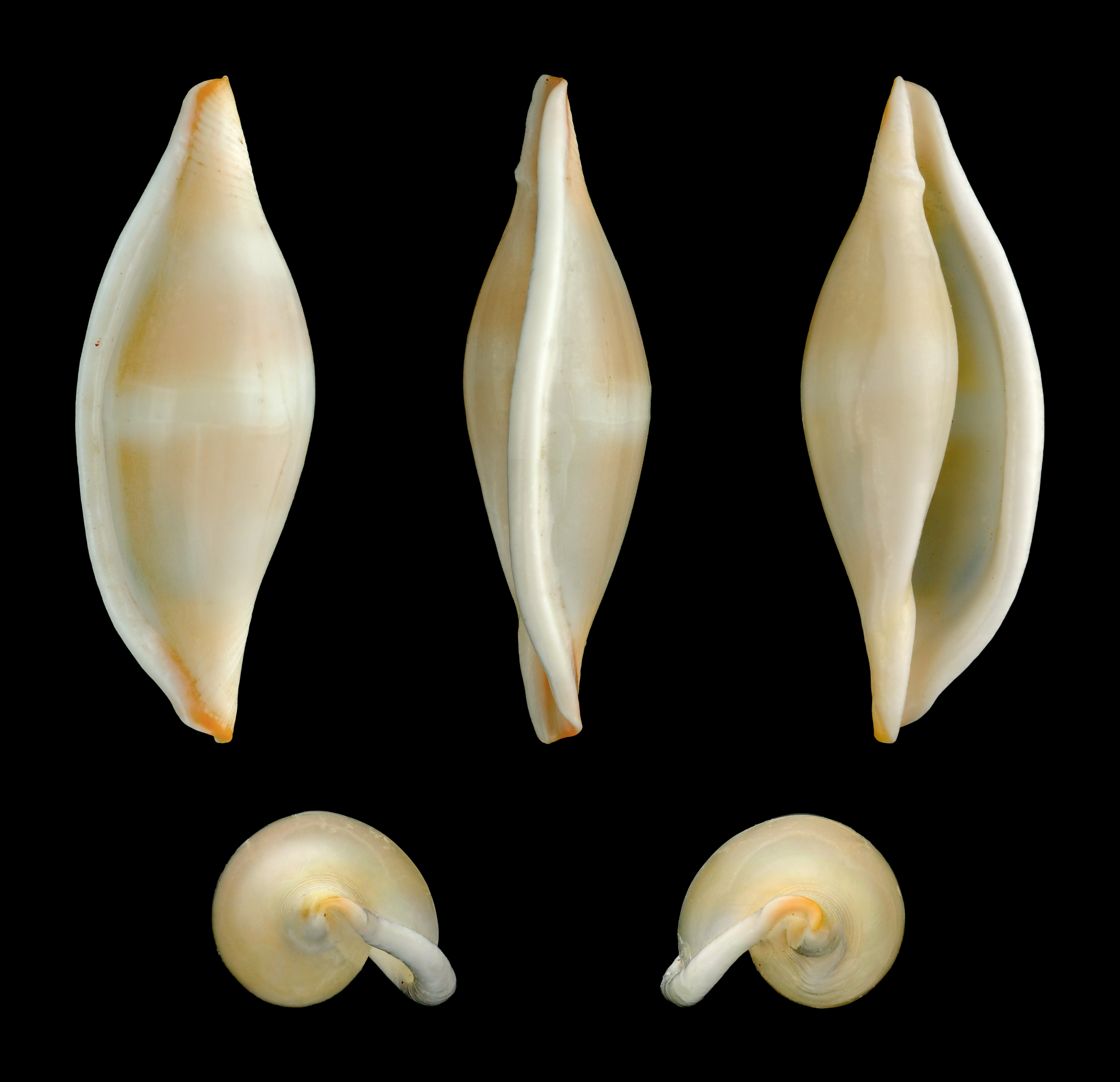

Scientific classification
- Kingdom: Animalia
- Phylum: Mollusca
- Class: Gastropoda
- Subclass: Caenogastropoda
- Order: Littorinimorpha
- Family: Ovulidae
- Genus: Phenacovolva
- Species: P. brevirostris

Binomial name
- Phenacovolva brevirostris (Schumacher, 1817)

Synonyms
- Ovula sowerbyana Weinkauff, 1881; Ovulum spelta Sowerby II, 1848; Ovulum speltum Sowerby II, 1848; Radius brevirostris Schumacher, 1817; Simnia sowerbyana Paetel, 1887

= Phenacovolva brevirostris =

Species of gastropod

Phenacovolva brevirostris is a species of sea snail, a marine gastropod mollusc in the family Ovulidae, the ovulids, cowry allies or false cowries.
