= Taniec z gwiazdami season 26 =

Polish TV show

Taniec z gwiazdami
- Season 26
- Hosted by: Krzysztof Ibisz; Paulina Sykut-Jeżyna
- Judges: Andrzej Piaseczny; Iwona Pavlović; Michał Malitowski; Andrzej Grabowski
- Celebrity winner: Ilona Krawczyńska
- Professional winner: Robert Rowiński
- No. of episodes: 10

Release
- Original network: Polsat
- Original release: 29 August – 31 October 2022

Season chronology
- ← Previous; Season 25 Next → Season 27

The 26th season of Taniec z gwiazdami, the Polish edition of Dancing with the Stars, was broadcast from 29 August to 31 October 2022. It was the thirteenth season aired on Polsat. For the second time the show was aired on Mondays. Iwona Pavlović, Michał Malitowski, Andrzej Grabowski and Andrzej Piaseczny will return as judges. Krzysztof Ibisz, Paulina Sykut-Jeżyna and Izabela Janachowska will reprise their role as hosts.

On 6 July 2022, it was announced that model Jacek Jelonek would feature in the first same-sex couple.

Sylwia Madeńska and Robert Rowiński returned to the series as a pro. Michał Danilczuk, Roman Osadchiy, Dominik Rudnicki-Sipajło and Julia Suryś joined the pros.

On 31 October, Ilona Krawczyńska and her partner Robert Rowiński were crowned the champions.

== Couples ==
Celebrity	Notability	Professional partner	Status	Source(s)
Łukasz Płoszajski	Pierwsza miłość actor	Wiktoria Omyła	Eliminated 1st on 29 August 2022	
Krzysztof Rutkowski	Detective and businessman	Sylwia Madeńska	Eliminated 2nd on 5 September 2022	
Maja Włoszczowska	Olympic mountain biker	Roman Osadchiy	Eliminated 3rd on 12 September 2022	
Agnieszka Litwin	Comedian & actress	Dominik Rudnicki-Sipajło	Eliminated 4th on 19 September 2022	
Michał Mikołajczak	Film and television actor	Julia Suryś	Eliminated 5th on 26 September 2022	
Jamala	Singer-songwriter & Eurovision 2016 winner	Jacek Jeschke	Eliminated 6th on 3 October 2022	
Karolina Pisarek-Salla	Model & Top Model runner-up	Michał Bartkiewicz	Eliminated 7th on 10 October 2022	
Natalia Janoszek	365 dni actress	Rafał Maserak	Eliminated 8th on 17 October 2022	
Wiesław Nowobilski	Nasz nowy dom construction designer	Janja Lesar	Third Place on 24 October 2022	
Jacek Jelonek	Model & Prince Charming star	Michał Danilczuk	Runners-up on 31 October 2022	
Ilona Krawczyńska	Influencer & Farma co-host	Robert Rowiński	Winners on 31 October 2022	

== Scores ==
Couple	Place	1	2	3	4	5	6	7	8	9		10
Ilona & Robert	1	33	35	32	33+29=62	35+6=41	35+2=37	39+40=79†	39+40=79†	39+40=79	—	39+36+40=115‡
Jacek & Michał	2	37†	34	40†	28+35=63	31+7=38	38	40+37=77	36+40=76	40+40=80†	+40=120†	38+38+40=116†
Wiesław & Janja	3	26	32	25‡	36+29=65†	26+1=27‡	28‡	33+36=69‡	30+35=65‡	36+35=71‡	+36=107‡	
Natalia & Rafał	4	36	37†	40†	34+29=63	40+5=45†	37+2=39†	38+40=78	36+40=76			
Karolina & Michał	5	26	17	27	28+35=63	28+2=30	33+4=37	34+36=70				
Jamala & Jacek	6	37†	25	38	30+35=65†	40+4=44	30+4=34					
Michał & Julia	7	21	30	26	21+29=50‡	31+3=34						
Agnieszka & Dominik	8	29	27	29	27+35=62							
Maja & Roman	9	30	28	28								
Krzysztof & Sylwia	10	17‡	15‡									
Łukasz & Wiktoria	11	25										

Red numbers indicate the lowest score for each week.
Green numbers indicate the highest score for each week.
indicates the couple eliminated that week.
indicates the returning couple that finished in the bottom two or three.
indicates the winning couple.
indicates the runner-up.
indicates the couple in third place.
indicates the couple withdrew from the competition.

== Average score chart ==
This table only counts for dances scored on a 40-points scale.

Rank by average	Place	Couple	Total points	Number of dances	Average
1	2	Jacek & Michał	632	17	37.2
2	4	Natalia & Rafał	407	11	37.0
3	1	Ilona & Robert	584	16	36.5
4	6	Jamala & Jacek	235	7	33.6
5	3	Wiesław & Janja	443	14	31.6
6	8	Agnieszka & Dominik	147	5	29.4
7	5	Karolina & Michał	264	9	29.3
8	9	Maja & Roman	86	3	28.7
9	7	Michał & Julia	158	6	26.3
10	11	Łukasz & Wiktoria	25	1	25.0
11	10	Krzysztof & Sylwia	32	2	16.0

== Highest and lowest scoring performances ==
The best and worst performances in each dance according to the judges' 40-point scale:

Dance	Best dancer(s)	Highest score	Worst dancer(s)	Lowest score
Samba	Natalia Janoszek	40	Karolina Pisarek-Salla; Agnieszka Litwin	27
Tango	Jamala	40	Krzysztof Rutkowski	15
Cha-cha-cha	Ilona Krawczyńska	39	Jamala	25
Salsa	Natalia Janoszek	40	Krzysztof Rutkowski	17
Charleston	Jacek Jelonek	40	Agnieszka Litwin	29
Viennese Waltz	Jamala	38	Michał Mikołajczak	21
Jive	Jacek Jelonek	40	Michał Mikołajczak	21
Waltz	Jamala	37	Agnieszka Litwin	29
Paso Doble	Jacek Jelonek; Ilona Krawczyńska	40	Michał Mikołajczak; Jamala	30
Contemporary	Natalia Janoszek; Jacek Jelonek	40	Karolina Pisarek-Salla	17
Quickstep	Jacek Jelonek; Ilona Krawczyńska	40	Michał Mikołajczak	26
Rumba	Natalia Janoszek; Ilona Krawczyńska	40	Maja Włoszczowska; Wiesław Nowobilski	28
Foxtrot	Ilona Krawczyńska	39	Jacek Jelonek	31
Swing	Ilona Krawczyńska	36	Karolina Pisarek-Salla	28
Rock and Roll	Jacek Jelonek; Natalia Janoszek	38		
Twist	Karolina Pisarek-Salla	34		
Team Dance	Karolina Pisarek-Salla; Agnieszka Litwin; Jamala; Jacek Jelonek	35	Ilona Krawczyńska; Michał Mikołajczak; Wiesław Nowobilski; Natalia Janoszek	29
Jive Marathon	Jacek Jelonek	7	Wiesław Nowobilski	1
Freestyle	Ilona Krawczyńska; Jacek Jelonek	40		

== Couples' highest and lowest scoring dances ==
According to the 40-point scale:

Couples	Highest scoring dance(s)	Lowest scoring dance(s)
Ilona & Robert	Quickstep, Paso Doble, Rumba, Freestyle (40)	Team Dance (29)
Jacek & Michał	Quickstep, Paso Doble (twice), Charleston, Jive, Contemporary, Freestyle (40)	Cha-cha-cha (28)
Wiesław & Janja	Waltz, Tango, Cha-cha-cha (36)	Jive (25)
Natalia & Rafał	Samba, Rumba, Contemporary, Salsa (40)	Team Dance (29)
Karolina & Michał	Cha-cha-cha (36)	Contemporary (17)
Jamala & Jacek	Tango (40)	Cha-cha-cha (25)
Michał & Julia	Contemporary (31)	Viennese Waltz, Jive (21)
Agnieszka & Dominik	Team Dance (35)	Cha-cha-cha, Samba (27)
Maja & Roman	Jive (30)	Viennese Waltz, Rumba (28)
Krzysztof & Sylwia	Salsa (17)	Tango (15)
Łukasz & Wiktoria	Tango (25)	Tango (25)

== Weekly scores ==
Unless indicated otherwise, individual judges scores in the charts below (given in parentheses) are listed in this order from left to right: Andrzej Piaseczny, Iwona Pavlović, Michał Malitowski and Andrzej Grabowski.

=== Week 1: Season Premiere ===
Running order

Couple	Score	Dance	Music	Result
Ilona & Robert	33 (9,8,8,8)	Samba	"Cotton Eye Joe"—Rednex	Safe
Łukasz & Wiktoria	25 (7,6,5,7)	Tango	"Początek"—Męskie Granie Orkiestra	Eliminated
Karolina & Michał	26 (7,5,6,8)	Cha-cha-cha	"Vogue"—Madonna	Safe
Krzysztof & Sylwia	17 (8,1,2,6)	Salsa	"La Pantera Mambo"—Orquesta La 33	Safe
Agnieszka & Dominik	29 (8,6,7,8)	Charleston	"Kabaret"—Katarzyna Jamróz	Safe
Michał & Julia	21 (7,4,4,6)	Viennese Waltz	"Earned It"—The Weeknd	Safe
Maja & Roman	30 (9,7,6,8)	Jive	"Don't Stop Me Now"—Queen	Safe
Jamala & Jacek	37 (9,8,10,10)	Waltz	"Imagine"—John Lennon	Safe
Wiesław & Janja	26 (8,6,5,7)	Cha-cha-cha	"Górą Ty"—Golec uOrkiestra & Gromee feat. Bedoes	Safe
Jacek & Michał	37 (10,9,9,9)	Jive	"Everybody Needs Somebody to Love"—John Belushi & Dan Aykroyd	Safe
Natalia & Rafał	36 (9,9,9,9)	Cha-cha-cha	"Jai Ho! (You Are My Destiny)"—The Pussycat Dolls	Safe

=== Week 2 ===
Running order

Couple	Score	Dance	Music	Result
Jamala & Jacek	25 (7,5,5,8)	Cha-cha-cha	"Strong Enough"—Cher	Safe
Michał & Julia	30 (8,8,6,8)	Paso Doble	"Hej hej!"—Daria Zawiałow	Safe
Natalia & Rafał	37 (10,9,8,10)	Contemporary	"Para"—Natalia Szroeder	Safe
Wiesław & Janja	32 (8,7,7,10)	Quickstep	"Despacito"—Luis Fonsi & Daddy Yankee	Safe
Maja & Roman	28 (9,5,6,8)	Viennese Waltz	"You Are the Reason"—Calum Scott	Safe
Krzysztof & Sylwia	15 (5,2,3,5)	Tango	"I've Seen That Face Before (Libertango)"—Grace Jones	Eliminated
Karolina & Michał	17 (7,1,2,7)	Contemporary	"Cześć, jak się masz?"—Sobel feat. Sanah	Safe
Agnieszka & Dominik	27 (8,6,6,7)	Cha-cha-cha	"Cold Heart"—Elton John & Dua Lipa	Safe
Ilona & Robert	35 (9,9,8,9)	Quickstep	"Crazy in Love"—Beyoncé feat. Jay Z	Safe
Jacek & Michał	34 (9,8,8,9)	Tango	"I Will Survive"—Gloria Gaynor	Safe

=== Week 3: Krzysztof Krawczyk Week ===
Running order

Couple	Score	Dance	Music	Result
Karolina & Michał	27 (8,6,5,8)	Samba	"Za Tobą pójdę jak na bal"—Krzysztof Krawczyk	Safe
Jacek & Michał	40 (10,10,10,10)	Quickstep	"Mój przyjacielu"—Krzysztof Krawczyk & Goran Bregović	Safe
Maja & Roman	28 (8,5,6,9)	Rumba	"Bo jesteś Ty"—Krzysztof Krawczyk	Eliminated
Jamala & Jacek	38 (9,9,10,10)	Viennese Waltz	"Pamiętam ciebie z tamtych lat"—Krzysztof Krawczyk	Safe
Wiesław & Janja	25 (8,4,5,8)	Jive	"Ostatni raz zatańczysz ze mną"—Krzysztof Krawczyk	Safe
Ilona & Robert	32 (9,7,7,9)	Rumba	"Trudno tak"—Krzysztof Krawczyk & Edyta Bartosiewicz	Safe
Natalia & Rafał	40 (10,10,10,10)	Samba	"Byle było tak"—Krzysztof Krawczyk	Safe
Agnieszka & Dominik	29 (9,5,7,8)	Waltz	"Chciałem być"—Krzysztof Krawczyk	Safe
Michał & Julia	26 (8,6,5,7)	Quickstep	"Jak minął dzień?"—Krzysztof Krawczyk	Safe

=== Week 4: Hometown Glory ===
Running order

Couple	Score	Dance	Music	Result
Agnieszka & Dominik	27 (8,5,7,7)	Samba	"Tico Tico"—Edmundo Ros	Eliminated
Ilona & Robert	33 (9,8,8,8)	Foxtrot	"Save Your Tears"—The Weeknd	Safe
Michał & Julia	21 (7,4,4,6)	Jive	"Be the One"—Dua Lipa	Safe
Natalia & Rafał	34 (9,9,7,9)	Waltz	"Easy on Me"—Adele	Safe
Jacek & Michał	28 (8,5,7,8)	Cha-cha-cha	"Poker Face"—Lady Gaga	Safe
Jamala & Jacek	30 (8,7,7,8)	Paso Doble	"Co mi Panie dasz?"—Bajm	Safe
Wiesław & Janja	36 (10,8,9,9)	Waltz	"Hero"—Mariah Carey	Safe
Karolina & Michał	28 (8,6,5,9)	Tango	"Królowa łez"—Agnieszka Chylińska	Safe
Ilona & Robert; Michał & Julia; Wiesław & Janja; Natalia & Rafał	29 (8,8,6,7)	Freestyle	"Alternatywy 4"—Jerzy Matuszkiewicz	
Karolina & Michał; Agnieszka & Dominik; Jamala & Jacek; Jacek & Michał	35 (9,9,8,9)	Freestyle	"The Shoop Shoop Song (It's in His Kiss)"—Cher	

=== Week 5: Polsat's 30th Anniversary ===
Running order

Couple	Score	Dance	Music	TV show	Result
Wiesław & Janja	26 (7,6,5,8)	Tango	"One Day in Your Life"—Anastacia	Idol	Safe
Karolina & Michał	28 (8,6,6,8)	Swing	"Radio Hello"—Enej	Must Be The Music. Tylko Muzyka	Safe
Jacek & Michał	31 (9,7,7,8)	Foxtrot	"Jesienne róże"—Mieczysław Fogg	Twoja twarz brzmi znajomo	Safe
Michał & Julia	31 (8,8,7,8)	Contemporary	"Adam i Ewa"—Budka Suflera	Adam i Ewa	Eliminated
Ilona & Robert	35 (9,9,8,9)	Waltz	"My Heart Will Go On"—Celine Dion	Titanic	Safe
Jamala & Jacek	40 (10,10,10,10)	Tango	"Por una Cabeza"—Carlos Gardel	Scent of a Woman	Safe
Natalia & Rafał	40 (10,10,10,10)	Rumba	"Zawsze tam, gdzie Ty"—Lady Pank	2014 FIVB Volleyball Men's World Championship	Safe
Jacek & Michał; Ilona & Robert; Natalia & Rafał; Jamala & Jacek; Michał & Julia; Karolina & Michał; Wiesław & Janja	7; 6; 5; 4; 3; 2; 1	Jive; Marathon	"Świat według Kiepskich"—Big Cyc	Świat według Kiepskich	

=== Week 6: Dirty Dancing Week ===
Running order

Couple	Score	Dance	Music	Result
Ilona & Robert; Karolina & Michał; Jamala & Jacek; Wiesław & Janja; Jacek & Michał; Natalia & Rafał	N/A	Group; Salsa	"(I've Had) The Time of My Life"—Bill Medley & Jennifer Warnes	
Ilona & Robert	35 (9,9,8,9)	Swing	"Be My Baby"—The Ronettes	Safe
Jamala & Jacek	30 (8,6,7,9)	Rumba	"She's Like The Wind"—Patrick Swayze feat. Wendy Fraser	Eliminated
Natalia & Rafał	37 (9,9,9,10)	Foxtrot	"Hey! Baby"—Bruce Channel	Safe
Jacek & Michał	38 (10,8,10,10)	Rock and Roll	"Do You Love Me"—The Contours	Safe
Wiesław & Janja	28 (8,5,6,9)	Rumba	"Hungry Eyes"—Eric Carmen	Safe
Karolina & Michał	33 (9,7,8,9)	Viennese Waltz	"You Don't Own Me"—The Blow Monkeys	Safe

Dance-offs
Couple	Judges votes	Dance	Music	Result
Ilona & Robert	Ilona, Natalia, Ilona, Natalia	Samba	"Don't Go Yet"—Camila Cabello	Draw (2 pts)
Natalia & Rafał	Ilona, Natalia, Ilona, Natalia	Samba	"Don't Go Yet"—Camila Cabello	Draw (2 pts)
Jamala & Jacek	Jamala, Jamala, Jamala, Jamala	Cha-cha-cha	"Sunshine Day"—Osibisa	Winner (4 pts)
Wiesław & Janja	Jamala, Jamala, Jamala, Jamala	Cha-cha-cha	"Sunshine Day"—Osibisa	Loser (0 pts)
Karolina & Michał	Karolina, Karolina, Karolina, Karolina	Tango	"Bad Habits"—Ed Sheeran	Winner (4 pts)
Jacek & Michał	Karolina, Karolina, Karolina, Karolina	Tango	"Bad Habits"—Ed Sheeran	Loser (0 pts)

=== Week 7: Trio Challenge ===
Running order

Couple	Score	Dance	Music	Result
Natalia & Rafał (Iwona Janoszek)	38 (9,9,10,10)	Rock and Roll	"Jailhouse Rock"—Elvis Presley	Safe
Natalia & Rafał (Iwona Janoszek)	40 (10,10,10,10)	Contemporary	"Jestem tylko dziewczyną"—Maria Sadowska	Safe
Jacek & Michał (Agnieszka Lal)	40 (10,10,10,10)	Paso Doble	"Canción del Mariachi"—Antonio Banderas	Safe
Jacek & Michał (Agnieszka Lal)	37 (9,9,9,10)	Quickstep	"Ostatnia nadzieja"—Sanah feat. Dawid Podsiadło	Safe
Karolina & Michał (Maryla Ambrożewicz)	34 (9,7,8,10)	Twist	"Chłopiec z gitarą"—Karin Stanek	Eliminated
Karolina & Michał (Maryla Ambrożewicz)	36 (9,9,8,10)	Cha-cha-cha	"Love Me Again"—John Newman	Eliminated
Wiesław & Janja (Barbara Nowobilska)	33 (9,7,7,10)	Swing	"Konik na biegunach"—Urszula	Safe
Wiesław & Janja (Barbara Nowobilska)	36 (10,9,7,10)	Waltz	"When I Fall in Love"—Nat King Cole	Safe
Ilona & Robert (Milena Krawczyńska)	39 (10,9,10,10)	Cha-cha-cha	"Let's Get Loud"—Jennifer Lopez	Safe
Ilona & Robert (Milena Krawczyńska)	40 (10,10,10,10)	Quickstep	"Walking On Sunshine"—Katrina and the Waves	Safe

=== Week 8: You Decide! ===
Running order

Couple (Judge)	Score	Dance	Music	Result
Ilona & Robert (Iwona Pavlović)	39 (10,10,9,10)	Foxtrot	"Girls Like You"—Maroon 5 feat. Cardi B	Safe
Ilona & Robert (Iwona Pavlović)	40 (10,10,10,10)	Paso Doble	"Les Toreadors"—Georges Bizet	Safe
Wiesław & Janja (Andrzej Grabowski)	30 (8,6,7,9)	Jive	"Daj mi znać"—Oskar Cyms	Safe
Wiesław & Janja (Andrzej Grabowski)	35 (9,8,8,10)	Viennese Waltz	"Moje jedyne marzenie"—Anna Jantar	Safe
Natalia & Rafał (Andrzej Piaseczny)	36 (10,9,8,9)	Waltz	"(You Make Me Feel Like) A Natural Woman"—Aretha Franklin	Eliminated
Natalia & Rafał (Andrzej Piaseczny)	40 (10,10,10,10)	Salsa	"Bam Bam"—Camila Cabello feat. Ed Sheeran	Eliminated
Jacek & Michał (Michał Malitowski)	36 (10,8,9,9)	Cha-cha-cha	"Can't Stop the Feeling"—Justin Timberlake	Safe
Jacek & Michał (Michał Malitowski)	40 (10,10,10,10)	Charleston	"We No Speak Americano"—Yolanda Be Cool & DCUP	Safe

=== Week 9: Trio Challenge (Semi-final) ===
Running order

Couple	Score	Dance	Music	Result
Jacek & Michał (Piotr Mróz)	40 (10,10,10,10)	Jive	"Wake Me Up Before You Go-Go"—Wham!	Bottom two
Jacek & Michał (Piotr Mróz)	40 (10,10,10,10)	Contemporary	"Fix You"—Coldplay	Bottom two
Ilona & Robert (Łukasz Jurkowski)	39 (10,10,9,10)	Tango	"Beggin'"—Måneskin	Safe
Ilona & Robert (Łukasz Jurkowski)	40 (10,10,10,10)	Rumba	"Hello"—Adele	Safe
Wiesław & Janja (Sławomir Zapała)	36 (10,8,8,10)	Tango	"La cumparsita"—Gerardo Matos Rodríguez	Bottom two
Wiesław & Janja (Sławomir Zapała)	35 (10,8,7,10)	Samba	"La Bamba"—Ritchie Valens	Bottom two

Dance-off

Running order

Couple	Score	Dance	Music	Result
Jacek & Michał	40 (10,10,10,10)	Paso Doble	"Łowcy gwiazd"—Cleo	Safe
Wiesław & Janja	36 (10,8,8,10)	Cha-cha-cha	"Żywioły"—Cleo	Third place

=== Week 10: Season Final ===
Running order

Couple	Score	Dance	Music	Result
Ilona & Robert	39 (10,10,9,10)	Jive	"Day-O"—Harry Belafonte	Winners
Ilona & Robert	36 (10,8,8,10)	Swing	"Be My Baby"—The Ronettes	Winners
Ilona & Robert	40 (10,10,10,10)	Freestyle	"To tylko tango"—Maanam "Krakowski spleen"—Maanam	Winners
Jacek & Michał	38 (10,10,8,10)	Salsa	"Cuban Pete"—Jim Carrey	Runners-up
Jacek & Michał	38 (10,9,9,10)	Foxtrot	"Jesienne róże"—Mieczysław Fogg	Runners-up
Jacek & Michał	40 (10,10,10,10)	Freestyle	"The Greatest Show"—Hugh Jackman "This Is Me"—Keala Settle	Runners-up

Other Dances

Couple	Dance	Music
Wiesław & Janja	Viennese Waltz	"I Will Always Love You"—Whitney Houston
Natalia & Rafał	Viennese Waltz	"I Will Always Love You"—Whitney Houston
Karolina & Michał	Viennese Waltz	"I Will Always Love You"—Whitney Houston
Jamala & Jacek	Viennese Waltz	"I Will Always Love You"—Whitney Houston
Michał & Julia	Viennese Waltz	"I Will Always Love You"—Whitney Houston
Agnieszka & Dominik	Viennese Waltz	"I Will Always Love You"—Whitney Houston
Maja & Roman	Viennese Waltz	"I Will Always Love You"—Whitney Houston
Krzysztof & Sylwia	Viennese Waltz	"I Will Always Love You"—Whitney Houston
Łukasz & Wiktoria	Viennese Waltz	"I Will Always Love You"—Whitney Houston

== Dance chart ==
The celebrities and professional partners danced one of these routines for each corresponding week:

- Week 1 (Season Premiere): Samba, Tango, Cha-cha-cha, Salsa, Charleston, Viennese Waltz, Jive, Waltz
- Week 2: One unlearned dance (introducing Paso Doble, Contemporary, Quickstep)
- Week 3 (Krzysztof Krawczyk Week): One unlearned dance (introducing Rumba)
- Week 4 (Hometown Glory): One unlearned dance (introducing Foxtrot) and Team Dance
- Week 5 (Polsat's 30th Anniversary): One unlearned dance (introducing Swing) and Jive Marathon
- Week 6 (Dirty Dancing Week): A group Salsa, one unlearned dance (introducing Rock and Roll) and dance-offs
- Week 7 (Trio Challenge): One unlearned dance (introducing Twist) and one repeated dance
- Week 8 (You Decide!): One unlearned dance and one repeated dance
- Week 9 (Semi-final: Trio Challenge): One unlearned dance, one repeated dance and dance-offs
- Week 10 (Season Final): One unlearned dance, one repeated dance (rivals' choice) and Freestyle

Couple	1	2	3	4		5		6			7		8		9			10		
Ilona & Robert	Samba	Quickstep	Rumba	Foxtrot	Freestyle (Team Dance)	Waltz	Jive (Marathon)	Salsa	Swing	Samba	Cha-cha-cha	Quickstep	Foxtrot	Paso Doble	Tango	Rumba	- (Immunity)	Jive	Swing	Freestyle
Jacek & Michał	Jive	Tango	Quickstep	Cha-cha-cha	Freestyle (Team Dance)	Foxtrot	Jive (Marathon)	Salsa	Rock and Roll	Tango	Paso Doble	Quickstep	Cha-cha-cha	Charleston	Jive	Contemporary	Paso Doble	Salsa	Foxtrot	Freestyle
Wiesław & Janja	Cha-cha-cha	Quickstep	Jive	Waltz	Freestyle (Team Dance)	Tango	Jive (Marathon)	Salsa	Rumba	Cha-cha-cha	Swing	Waltz	Jive	Viennese Waltz	Tango	Samba	Cha-cha-cha			Viennese Waltz
Natalia & Rafał	Cha-cha-cha	Contemporary	Samba	Waltz	Freestyle (Team Dance)	Rumba	Jive (Marathon)	Salsa	Foxtrot	Samba	Rock and Roll	Contemporary	Waltz	Salsa						Viennese Waltz
Karolina & Michał	Cha-cha-cha	Contemporary	Samba	Tango	Freestyle (Team Dance)	Swing	Jive (Marathon)	Salsa	Viennese Waltz	Tango	Twist	Cha-cha-cha								Viennese Waltz
Jamala & Jacek	Waltz	Cha-cha-cha	Viennese Waltz	Paso Doble	Freestyle (Team Dance)	Tango	Jive (Marathon)	Salsa	Rumba	Cha-cha-cha										Viennese Waltz
Michał & Julia	Viennese Waltz	Paso Doble	Quickstep	Jive	Freestyle (Team Dance)	Contemporary	Jive (Marathon)													Viennese Waltz
Agnieszka & Dominik	Charleston	Cha-cha-cha	Waltz	Samba	Freestyle (Team Dance)															Viennese Waltz
Maja & Roman	Jive	Viennese Waltz	Rumba																	Viennese Waltz
Krzysztof & Sylwia	Salsa	Tango																		Viennese Waltz
Łukasz & Wiktoria	Tango																			Viennese Waltz

Highest scoring dance
Lowest scoring dance
Performed, but not scored
Bonus points
Not performed due to withdrawal
Gained bonus points for winning this dance-off
Gained no bonus points for losing this dance-off

== Guest performances ==
Date	Artist(s)	Song(s)	Dancers
29 August 2022	Tomasz Szymuś's Orchestra	"Paranoia"	All professional dancers, celebrities and judges
12 September 2022	Tomasz Szymuś's Orchestra	"Parostatek"	All professional dancers and celebrities
12 September 2022	Andrzej Piaseczny	"Rysunek na szkle"	—
26 September 2022	Alicja Janosz	"One Day in Your Life"	Wiesław Nowobilski and Janja Lesar
26 September 2022	Enej	"Radio Hello"	Karolina Pisarek-Salla and Michał Bartkiewicz
26 September 2022	Stefano Terrazzino	"Jesienne róże"	Jacek Jelonek and Michael Danilczuk
26 September 2022	Big Cyc	"Świat według Kiepskich"	All couples
10 October 2022	Maria Sadowska	"Jestem tylko dziewczyną"	Natalia Janoszek and Rafał Maserak
17 October 2022	Oskar Cyms	"Daj mi znać"	Wiesław Nowobilski and Janja Lesar
17 October 2022	Sławomir Zapała & Magdalena Kajrowicz-Zapała	"Będę z nią"	NEXT Dance Group
24 October 2022	Mateusz Ziółko	"Vis-à-vis"	Wiktoria Omyła, Roman Osadchiy and Dominik Rudnicki-Sipajło
24 October 2022	Cleo	"Łowcy gwiazd"	Jacek Jelonek and Michael Danilczuk
24 October 2022	Cleo	"Żywioły"	Wiesław Nowobilski and Janja Lesar
31 October 2022	Doda	"Melodia ta"	All professional dancers
31 October 2022	Doda	"Wodospady"	NEXT Dance Group
31 October 2022	Tomasz Szymuś's Orchestra	Night at the Museum songs medley	UKS Top Dance Pruszków & Fala Sopot Dance (Kids) Groups
31 October 2022	Jamala	"1944" / "Take Me to a Place"	—
31 October 2022	Stefano Terrazzino	"Jesienne róże"	Jacek Jelonek and Michael Danilczuk
31 October 2022	Sabina Jeszka	"To tylko tango" / "Krakowski spleen"	Ilona Krawczyńska and Robert Rowiński
31 October 2022	Joanna Jakubas	"I Will Always Love You"	All couples

== Rating figures ==
Date	Episode	Official rating 4+	Share 4+	Official rating 16–49	Share 16–49	Official rating 16–59	Share 16–59
29 August 2022	1	1 251 903	10,35%	370 297	8,81%	525 592	8,47%
5 September 2022	2	1 230 526	9,75%	364 293	8,45%	487 112	7,55%
12 September 2022	3	1 188 455	9,22%	320 509	7,21%	471 624	7,22%
19 September 2022	4	978 046	7,55%	275 478	6,00%	381 315	5,65%
26 September 2022	5	1 155 062	9,00%	348 370	7,85%	464 910	7,10%
3 October 2022	6	1 096 323	8,18%	280 459	5,94%	388 273	5,67%
10 October 2022	7	1 144 489	8,73%	295 904	6,34%	426 044	6,24%
17 October 2022	8	1 029 668	7,89%	251 123	5,51%	380 694	5,67%
24 October 2022	9	1 087 378	8,30%	272 158	6,12%	403 960	6,11%
31 October 2022	10	1 209 293	9,66%	323 920	7,66%	482 124	7,57%
Average	Fall 2022	1 137 114	8,86%	310 251	6,99%	441 165	6,73%
