= Makumba (disambiguation) =

Macumba or Makumba is a generic term for various Afro-Brazilian religions.

Makumba or Macumba may also refer to:

== People ==
- Hellen Makumba, Zambian sprinter
- Maurice Muhatia Makumba, Kenyan Catholic prelate

== Places ==
- Macumba River, river in South Australia
- Macumba Station, pastoral lease in South Australia

== Songs ==
- "Makumba" (song), 2021 song by Noemi and Carl Brave
- "Makumba" (Big Cyc song), song by Big Cyc from the 1996 album Z gitarą wśród zwierząt
- "Macumba", song by Verónica Castro from the 1986 album Simplemente Todo
- "Makumba", 2004 song by Yuri da Cunha

== Other uses ==
- Cyphoma macumba, species of gastropod
- Makumba, fictional character in the 2000 Polish film The Last Mission
- Makumba, 1965 play by Ulrich Becher
- Makumba, czyli drzewo gadające, 1968 novel by Michał Choromański

== See also ==
- Macumba Love, 1960 American film
