= Moherowe Berety =

Song by Big Cyc

from the album Moherowe Berety
- Language: Polish
- Genre: Rock
- Label: Universal Music Polska

'Moherowe Berety' is the second track on the album Moherowe Berety by Big Cyc. It was released in 2006 by Universal Music Polska. A music video was made for this song, funded by Sabina Kluszczyński of Heavy Vision.
