= Golonka =

Golonka may refer to:

- Golonka, the Polish name of a dish of boiled ham hock known in German as Eisbein
- Golonka Love, 2008 album by jazz band The Core (band)
- Golonka, flaki i inne przysmaki, 1995 album by punk rock band Big Cyc
- Arlene Golonka (1936–2021), American actress
- Jozef Golonka (born 1938), Slovak ice hockey player
- Kelsey Golonka, Miss Vermont Teen USA 2017 and Miss Vermont USA 2022
- Taylor Golonka, Boogaloo Shrimp film director
