= Flamingo tongue =

Flamingo tongue may refer to:

- The tongue of the flamingo, which was considered a delicacy in Ancient Rome
- The flamingo tongue snail (Cyphoma gibbosum), a species of small, brightly colored sea snail
