= Wojna plemników =

Studio album by Big Cyc
- Released: 1993
- Recorded: 1993
- Genre: Punk rock

Big Cyc chronology
Miłość, muzyka, mordobicie (1992)	Wojna plemników (1993)	Nie zapomnisz nigdy (1994)

Wojna plemników (Polish War of spermatozoons) is the fourth studio album of punk rock band Big Cyc, released on 1993.

== Track listing ==
1. "Wojna plemników" (War of spermatozoons)
2. "Towar schodzi cały dzień" (I'm selling it all day)
3. "Od przyjaciół moskali" (From my Moscow friends)
4. "De mono" (Polish pronunciation for The mono) — a parody cover Polish pop rock hit De Mono "Kochać Inaczej" (To love differently)
5. "Polska rodzina" (Polish family)
6. "Bałkański turysta" (Balkan tourist)
7. "Synagoga dla pieroga" (Synagogue for Pierogi)
8. "Berlin Zachodni II" (West Berlin II)
9. "Jazda" (Hellride)
10. "Ostry dyżur" (Emergency)
11. "Chuligani i złodzieje" (Hooligans and thieves)
12. "Kobiety z Sarajewa" (Women from Sarajevo)
13. "Piosenka o Solidarności czyli Wszystko gnije" (Song about Solidarność, that is everythings rotting)

== Credits ==
- Dżej Dżej – bass guitar, lead vocal
- Dżery – drums, vocal
- Piękny Roman – lead guitar, vocal
- Skiba – vocal, lyrics
