= Z partyjnym pozdrowieniem. 12 hitów w stylu lambada hardcore =

Studio album by Big Cyc
- Released: 4 October 1990
- Recorded: 1990
- Genre: Punk rock
- Length: 41:27
- Label: Polskie Nagrania Muza
- Producer: Jan Lizikowski

Big Cyc chronology
| Z partyjnym pozdrowieniem. 12 hitów w stylu lambada hardcore (1990) | Nie wierzcie elektrykom (1991) |

Z partyjnym pozdrowieniem. 12 hitów w stylu lambada hardcore (Note: Polish pronunciation: [ˈzɘ̟ parˈtɘj.nɘ̟m pɔ.zdrɔˈvjɛ.ɲɛm dvaˈnaɕ.t͡ɕɛ ˈxi.tuf ˈvɘ̟ ˈstɘ̟.lu lamˈba.da xarˈtkɔ.rɛ]) (lit. 'With the Party Greeting. 12 Hits in the Lambada Hardcore Style'), also simply known as Z partyjnym pozdrowieniem, is a 1990 Polish-language punk rock album by band Big Cyc. It was released by Polskie Nagrania Muza, with the music recorded at Izabelin Studio. It was their debut.

== History ==
The band Big Cyc was formed in 1988, and consisted of Jacek Jędrzejak, Jarosław Lis, Roman Lechowicz and Robert Rajewski. They were later joined by Krzysztof Skiba. The notable songs then recorded by the band, which would later be included in the album, included "Kapitan Żbik", and "Wielka miłość do babci klozetowej". The band debuted in March 1990 at the happening concert in club Balbina in Łódź, titled Uroczysta akademia z okazji 75-lecia wynalezienia damskiego biustonosza. Later that year, the band performed in West Berlin during the Schwarze Tage festival.

In 1990, the band recorded new songs at Izabelin Studio. These included "Berlin Zachodni" which became a hit. The songs "Kapitan Żbik" and "Berlin Zachodni", were placed, respectively, first, and forth, on the Lista Przebojów Programu Trzeciego music chart of the Polskie Radio Program III. The band originally considered publishing their album with Izabelin Studio, however, they published it with Polskie Nagrania Muza instead. It is estimated that the album had sold over 200, 000 copies and had over 800, 000 pirated copies made. The album became a hit and was critically acclaimed.

In 1991, the editors of the magazine Teraz Rock awarded Big Cyc with the title of the best band of the year, the best song of the year for "Berlin Zachodni", and the best album cover for the Z partyjnym pozdrowieniem. Krzysztof Skiba from the band was awarded the title of the best songwriter of the year.

== Track listing ==
=== A-side ===
1. "Berlin Zachodni" (West Berlin) (4:51)
2. "Durna piosenka" (Dumb song) (3:34)
3. "Niedziela" (Sunday), a parody cover of "Niedziela będzie dla nas" (Sunday will be for us) by Niebiesko-Czarni (2:30)
4. "Aktywiści" (Activists) (4:04)
5. "Wielka miłość do babci klozetowej" (Great love to the toilet granny) (3:54)
6. "Kapitan Żbik" (Captain Żbik) (2:45)

=== B-side ===
1. "Piosenka góralska" (Highland song), a parody cover of "Z kopyta kulig rwie" (With a hoof the sleigh rides) by Skaldowie (2:09)
2. "Dzieci Frankensteina" (Frankenstein's children) (3:26)
3. "Kontestacja" (Contestation) (3:49)
4. "Orgazm" (Orgasm) (2:23)
5. "Sąsiedzi" (Neighbours) (3:10)
6. "Ballada o smutnym skinie" (Ballad of a sad skinhead) (5:52)

== Album cover ==
The album cover was designed by Piotr Łopatka. It featured the portrait of Vladimir Lenin with punk Mohawk hairstyle. Originally, the record label opposed publishing such cover, in regard to uncertainty during the period of government transition, from socialism to capitalism. Eventually, the label agreed for the cover. In 1991, the plebiscite of the magazine Teraz Rock awarded it with the title of the best album cover of the year.

== Personnel ==
- main vocals: Jacek Jędrzejak, Jarosław Lis
- support vocals: Krzysztof Skiba, Roman Lechowicz
- bass guitar: Jacek Jędrzejak
- drums: Jarosław Lis
- music production: Jan Lizikowski
- sound production: Andrzej Puczyński
- cover design: Piotr Łopatka
- music video cinematography: Paweł Zimnicki
