= Nie wierzcie elektrykom =

Studio album by Big Cyc
- Released: 1991
- Recorded: 1991
- Genre: Punk rock

Big Cyc chronology
Z partyjnym pozdrowieniem. 12 hitów w stylu lambada hardcore (1990)	Nie wierzcie elektrykom (1991)	Miłość, muzyka, mordobicie (1992)

Professional ratings
Review scores
Source	Rating
Teraz Rock	4/5 stars
Tylko Rock	(1991) (2000)

Nie wierzcie elektrykom (Polish Don't trust the electricians) is the second studio album of the punk rock band Big Cyc, released in 1991. The title is a pun on "Don't trust the politicians", and it alludes to Lech Wałęsa's profession. The president of Poland was also depicted on the cover in an iconoclastic way, wearing a jacket with a Playboy badge (rather than a Virgin Mary badge, which Wałęsa actually wore). The album emulated a radio show, with the songs separated by nonsense dialogue between two "hosts", Skiba and Paweł "Konjo" Konnak.

== Track listing ==
1. "Marian, wierny kibic" (Marian, a faithful football fan)
2. "Chrześcijańscy kanibale" (Christian cannibals)
3. "Oszukani partyzanci" (Deceived partisans)
4. "Nie ma tu nikogo" (There's nobody here)
5. "Polacy" (The Poles)
6. "Biały miś" (White Teddy Bear)
7. "Kanar?" (Ticket Controller?)
8. "Ruskie idą" (The Russians are coming)
9. "Nie wierzcie elektrykom" (Don't trust the electricians)
10. "Karel rege" (Karel Reggae)

== Credits ==
- Dżej Dżej – bass guitar, lead vocals
- Dżery – drums, vocals
- Piękny Roman – lead guitar, vocals
- Skiba – vocals, lyrics, 'radio host'

Guest starring:

- Marek Piekarczyk - vocals on Biały miś
- Paweł "Konjo" Konnak - 'radio host'
