= Władysław Piórek =

Polish physician, social activist (1852–1926)

Dr. Władysław Piórek
- Władysław Piórek
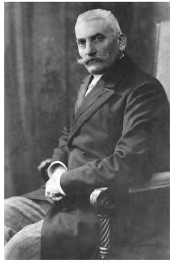
- Władysław Piórek
- Born: 27 November 1852; Ostrów Wielkopolski, Kingdom of Prussia
- Died: 17 August 1926 (aged 73); Bydgoszcz, Poland
- Resting place: Nowofarny Cemetery, Bydgoszcz
- Occupations: physician, social activist
- Spouse: Anna Maria Magdalena Folleher
- Children: Stefan, Wanda, Łucjan, Stanisław

Władysław Piórek (1852–1926) was a Polish physician, social and national activist. He was active in the parish community of the Cathedral of St. Martin and Nicholas in Bydgoszcz and supported the movement to build the Church of the Holy Trinity. Władysław Piórek was considered the leader of the Polish residents of Bromberg/Bydgoszcz. He was the first person to be made Honorary Citizen of Bydgoszcz.

== Life ==
=== Youth and medical practice ===
Władysław Piórek was born on 27 November 1852, in Ostrów Wielkopolski, then Ostrowo in the Kingdom of Prussia. He was the son of Paweł, a non-commissioned officer conscripted into the Prussian army who, after leaving the forces, became a janitor at the boys' gymnasium in Ostrowo. His mother was Marianna née Oberst, a German woman from the Rhineland.

He completed primary school at home, then studied at the gymnasium where his father worked in Ostrowo; he passed there his matriculation exam in 1871.

Władysław took part in the Franco-Prussian War and after a short stint in a construction business, he turned to studying medicine between April 1872 and August 1876 at the Berlin university. After completion of his doctorate in 1877, he practiced for eight years in Krajenka (then Krojanke), 85 kilometres (53 mi) west of Bydgoszcz. During this period, he met his future wife Anna.

In 1885, he moved permanently to Bydgoszcz, then Bromberg, and opened there a medical practice at 9 Wool Market Square (Polish: 3 Wełniany Rynek, German: 3 Wollmarkt). On 22 April 1889, he passed the district physician state examination in Berlin, giving him the right of making a professional career in the Prussian administration. In 1902, he was granted the title of sanitary counselor and at the beginning of World War I (1915) was promoted to privy sanitary counselor. In Bydgoszcz, he was considered a good diagnostician. He enjoyed great popularity among Polish patients from the city and the surrounding suburbs.

On 8 April 1895, Anna and Władysław Piórek purchased a tenement built in 1882 at then 8 Wilhelmstraße (present-day 22 Focha Street).

=== Activist ===
Władysław combined his medical practice with activities in the nationalist and social fields. By reaching out to many Polish families, he awakened and kept high the spirit of Polishness. He cooperated with the Bydgoszcz "Falcon" Polish Gymnastic Society (Polish: Polskie Towarzystwo Gimnastyczne "Sokół") just created in 1886.

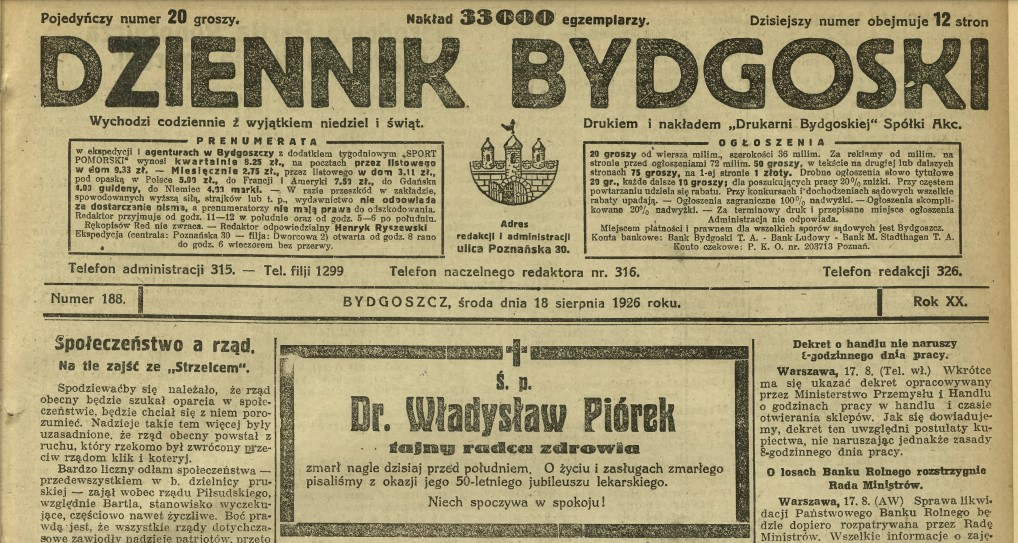
Obituary notice in the Dzinnik Bydgoski, 18 August 1926

For over a quarter of a century, he was active in the parish community of the Cathedral of St. Martin and Nicholas in Bydgoszcz. He participated with great commitment in the preparatory work aimed at erecting the Church of the Holy Trinity (1898–1912). Piórek actively supported the Polish cultural, educational and charitable institutions in the town. For several years he was the president of the Social and Merchant Circle, which brought together representatives of the Bydgoszcz intelligentsia and bourgeoisie.

By and large, Władysław Piórek was considered the leader of the Polish residents of Bromberg/Bydgoszcz. In 1920, he became the chief physician of the Health Fund. In politics, Piórek was a member of the Popular National Union (Polish: Związek Ludowo-Narodowy/ZLN). As a physician, he actively participated in the work of the Polish Medical Association.

He died suddenly on 17 August 1926, in Bydgoszcz. He was buried at the Nowofarny Cemetery.

== Family ==
On 11 August 1882, Władysław Piórek married Anna Maria Magdalena, née Folleher (1865–1945). She was the daughter of Joseph Folleher, owner of an estate in Silno. They had four children:

- Wanda (1888–1980)
- Łucjan Władysław (1891–1958). He studied in primary and secondary school in Bydgoszcz and decided to become a doctor. He studied medicine at several universities (Munich, Krakow, Berlin and Leipzig), during the difficult period of World War I. Eventually, Łucjan graduated from Leipzig in October 1917: he specialized in infectious diseases, gynecology, and later in surgery. After the end of World War I, he volunteered as a physician to the Polish army. As such he fought during the Greater Poland Uprising, the 1920 Polish–Soviet War, the third Silesian Uprising (1921) and the Polish Defensive War of 1939. He was taken prisoner by the Germans during the Battle of the Bzura. After his release in 1940, he settled permanently in Kutno where he worked as a doctor at the District Hospital, a family doctor, and a gynecologist. Łucjan Piórek died on 16 November 1958 in Kutno;
- Stanisław Stefan Augustyn (1892–1973). He had studied agronomy at the Agricultural University in Berlin and took over the management (but not the ownership) of the family estate in Silno. Thanks to his knowledge, the property thrived during the interwar. Stanisław married Helena Pyttlik in 1928. During WWII, the occupying forces appointed a new trustee to the estate, who pushed the Stanisław family to quick deportation to the work camp of Potulice on 1 September 1942. They ended up in a Resettlement Center in Łódź.

After the liberation, the Piórek family could return to the Chojnice district: they were later reunited with Stanisław in November 1945. He then worked as a clerk and died in 1973.

=== Wanda Piórka (1888–1980) ===
She graduated in 1907 from the boarding school of the Ursulines Sisters in Kraków. During this period, she came into contact with many Polish characters, such as the poet and playwright Lucjan Rydel, who gave her Polish lessons. Back to Bydgoszcz, she got involved in social work for the Polish Reading Room for Women (Polish: Towarzystwo Czytelni dla Kobiet) and the Society for Scientific Aid for Young Women.

In January 1910, she married a Bydgoszcz lawyer, Wincenty Nowicki. The couple had two daughters, Zofia (born 1914) and Jadwiga (b. 1917). Wincenty served during WWI in Warsaw but died from illness in 1922.

The same year, Wanda took for second husband Franciszek Górski. The latter was a merchant and owner of an export-import company in the Free City of Danzig. He was also the Norwegian consul in Madagascar, as his firm imported valuable raw materials from the island. As a consequence, the couple and Wanda's daughters lived from 1923 to 1926 in the then-French colony. Franciszek had been gassed as a Prussian soldier during the First World War and his health was fragile. His deteriorating state urged the family to return to Poland. During the trip back, Franciszek died on a plantation in Madagascar: his corpse was buried in a cemetery in Nîmes, France.

Wanda and her daughters settled back again to Bydgoszcz in the family tenement house at 22 Focha Street. There, they lived by renting apartments in adjoining buildings. With economic independence, Wanda could throw herself into social activities in several associations and organizations, such as the Polish Red Cross or the Society of Friends of France (Polish: Towarzystwo Przyjaciół Francji).

During the Occupation of Poland, Wanda and her mother Anna were expelled from Focha Street by German forces in 1940 and were moved to an annex of an old house at 42 Grunwaldzka street. After the war, despite strenuous efforts, Wanda could not get the Focha Street house back; her mother Anna died in 1945. Wanda Górska lived in rough conditions in a temporary apartment at 42 Grunwaldzka Street until her death on 14 April 1980.

=== Zofia Piórka (1914–1996) ===
Zofia (1914–1996) became a journalist.

In 196 she married the poet and painter Marian Turwid (1905–1987).

=== Jadwiga Piórka (1917–2014) ===
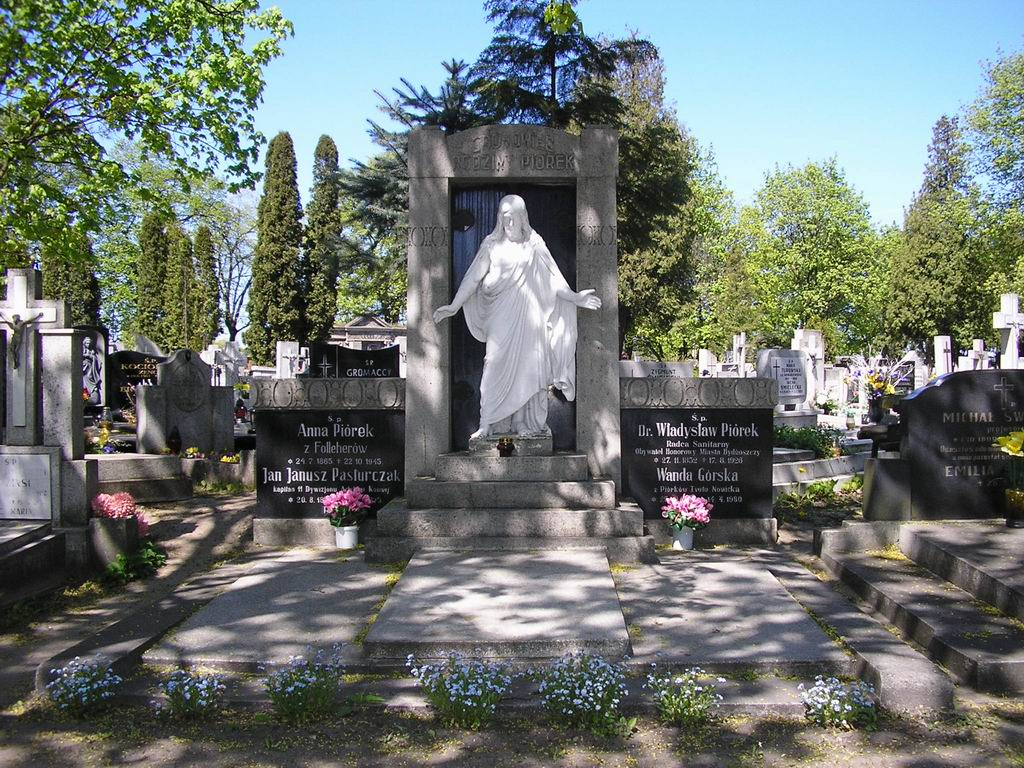
Piorek family tomb in Bydgoszcz

Zofia's younger sister Jadwiga wed in the same year (1936) Janusz Pasturczak (1899–1976), a military captain from Włocławek. Janusz was captured by the Germans early in the war and spent the entire time in camps (Magdeburg, Lübeck and Tangerhutte).

Jadwiga spent the German occupation in Warsaw after the evacuation of military families from Bydgoszcz. She fought in the Warsaw Uprising. After the war, the couple settled back in Bydgoszcz. Janusz Pasturczak worked as an agricultural property inspector.

Jadwiga Pasturczak was widowed in 1975. She then lived in a block of flats on Sułkowskiego Street. Jadwiga's passion for horses made her an active riding instructor till 2012. She died on 10 October 2014 and was buried in the family tomb at the Nowofarny Cemetery in Bydgoszcz.

== Awards and honours ==
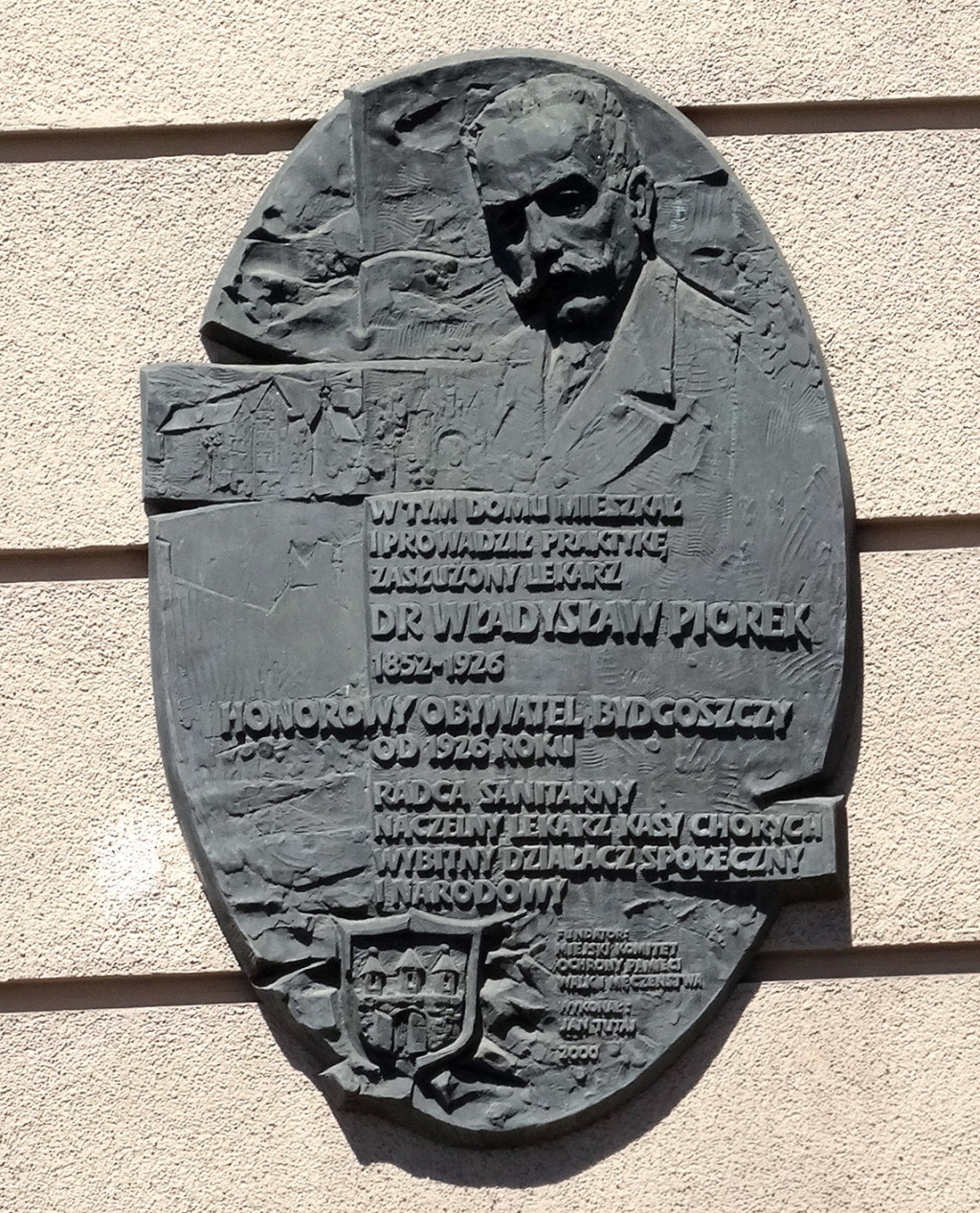
Władysław Piórek plaque

In 1926, the city council of Bydgoszcz passed a resolution to award Władysław Piórek the dignity of "Honorary Citizen of the City of Bydgoszcz". The award ceremony took place on 8 August 1926, in conjunction with Piórek's 50th anniversary of medical practice. He was the first person to be honored with such a title since the return of Bydgoszcz to Polish authorities.

On March 18, 1938, a portrait of Władysław Piórek was ceremonially hung in the conference room of the City Council. This painting was lost during World War II.

In February 1981, a street in Bydgoszcz Fordon district was named after him.

In 2000, a commemorative plaque to his memory was unveiled on the wall of his ancient tenement on Focha Street.

In 2017, the city authorities baptized one of the new Bydgoszcz trams under his name, after a citizen plebiscite.

== See also ==
- Bydgoszcz
- List of Polish people
- Sokół movement

== Bibliography ==
- (in Polish) Błażejewski, Stanisław; Kutta, Janusz; Romaniuk, Marek (1994). Bydgoski Słownik Biograficzny. Tom I [Bydgoszcz Biographical Dictionary]. Bydgoszcz: Kujawsko-Pomorskie Towarzystwo Kulturalne. pp. 87–88.
- (in Polish) Błażejewski, Stanisław; Kutta, Janusz; Romaniuk, Marek (1995). Bydgoski Słownik Biograficzny. Tom II [Bydgoszcz Biographical Dictionary]. Bydgoszcz: Kujawsko-Pomorskie Towarzystwo Kulturalne. p. 69.
- (in Polish) Kutta, Janusz (2000). Turwid-Kaczmarek Zofia Maria Wanda z d. Nowicka (1914–1996). Bydgoski Słownik Biograficzny. Tom VI [Bydgoszcz Biographical Dictionary]. Bydgoszcz: Kujawsko-Pomorskie Towarzystwo Kulturalne. pp. 113–114.
- (in Polish) Jastrzębski, Włodzimierz (2014). Pomiędzy Bydgoszczą a Silnem. Saga rodziny Piórków. Kronika Bydgoska XXXV [Between Bydgoszcz and Silno. The Saga of the Piórek Family. Bydgoszcz Chronicles XXXV]. Bydgoszcz: Mittlersche Buchhandlung. pp. 501–515.
