= Cyphoma versicolor =

Scientific classification
- Kingdom: Animalia
- Phylum: Mollusca
- Class: Gastropoda
- Subclass: Caenogastropoda
- Order: Littorinimorpha
- Family: Ovulidae
- Genus: Cyphoma
- Species: C. versicolor

Binomial name
- Cyphoma versicolor Fehse, 2003

Species of gastropod

Cyphoma versicolor is a species of sea snail, a marine gastropod mollusc in the family Ovulidae, the ovulids, cowry allies or false cowries.

== Description ==
The maximum recorded shell length is 21 mm.

== Habitat ==
It has been recorded at depths of 45 to 50 m.
