= Świat według Kiepskich (album) =

Studio album by Big Cyc
- Released: 11 June 2000
- Recorded: 1999
- Studio: Studio Hendrix
- Genre: Punk rock
- Length: 41:04
- Label: EMI Music Poland
- Producer: Leszek Wojtas

Big Cyc chronology
Wszyscy święci (1999)	Świat według Kiepskich (2000)	Zmień z nami płeć (2002)

Świat według Kiepskich (Note: translation from Polish: The world according to the Kiepskis, with surname Kiepski roughly translating to the English terms poor or shoddy) is a Polish-language studio album by the punk rock band Big Cyc. It was released on 11 June 2000, by the EMI Music Poland record label. Its titular song was commissioned as the theme song of the sitcom Świat według Kiepskich. The album was recorded in 1999, in the studio Hendrix in Lublin, Poland. In 2001, the album was awarded the diamond certification by the Polish Society of the Phonographic Industry, for selling 50 000 copies. Songs of the album are separated by the monologues of Andrzej Grabowski in the role of the main character of the television series, Ferdynand Kiepski.

== Track listing ==
1. Ferdynand Kiepski ujawnia całą prawdę o zespole Big Cyc* (F. Kiepski discloses all truth about Big Cyc)
2. "Świat według Kiepskich" (The world according to Kiepscy)
3. "Czas na rwanie" (Time to score) – cover of Die Toten Hosen
4. "Kumple Janosika" (Janosik's pals)
5. Bardzo ważne przesłanie Ferdusia Kiepskiego do kierowców* (F. Kiepski's very important message to the drivers)
6. "Mały Fiat" (Small Fiat)
7. Bełkot Ferdynanda* (Ferdynand's mumbling)
8. "Kocham piwo" (I love beer)
9. "Śmieci" (Scum)
10. Ferdynand Kiepski coś krzyczy* (Ferdynand Kiepski shouts something)
11. "Bułgarka" (Bulgarian girl) – a version of a children's song Stokrotka
12. Kolejny bezsensowny monolog Ferdynanda Kiepskiego* (Another nonsense monologue of F. Kiepski)
13. "Nasza rodzinka" (Our family) – cover of Tito Puente's El Mundo
14. "Zawsze płyń pod prąd" (Always go against the stream)
15. Ferdynand Kiepski głupieje od tego wszystkiego* (F. Kiepski goes nuts of it all)
16. "Niech każdy robi to co chce" (Let everyone do what they please) – cover of Locomotiv GT
17. "Wyróżnienie" (Distinction)
18. "Hipermarket"
19. Kiepski ujawnia informację, która może uratować świat (Kiepski discloses an information which may save the world)
20. "Idą święta" (Christmas is coming)
21. Ferdynand Kiepski współczuje* (Ferdynand Kiepski is sorry)

The asterisk marks Kiepski's monologues.

== Credits ==
- Dżej Dżej – bass guitar, lead vocals
- Dżery – drums, vocals
- Piękny Roman – lead guitar, vocals
- Skiba – vocals, lyrics

Guest starring:

- Andrzej Grabowski as Ferdynand Kiepski
- Magda Femme – vocals on Czas na rwanie
- Jacek Dewódzki – vocals on Kocham piwo
