= Z gitarą wśród zwierząt =

Studio album by Big Cyc
- Released: 1996
- Recorded: 1996
- Genre: Punk rock

Big Cyc chronology
Golonka, flaki i inne przysmaki (1995)	Z gitarą wśród zwierząt (1996)	Pierwsza komunia, drugie śniadanie, trzecia Rzeczpospolita (1997)

Z gitarą wśród zwierząt - (Polish Among the animals with a guitar) is a studio album of the punk rock band Big Cyc, released in 1996.

The title refers to a popular Polish TV educational show, Z kamerą wśród zwierząt (Polish Among the animals with a camera), led by Antoni and Hanna Gucwiński, the managers of the Wrocław zoo.

== Track listing ==
1. "Józef Oleksy o Shazzie" (Józef Oleksy about Shazza)
2. "Shazza, moja miłość" (Shazza, my love)
3. "Makumba"
4. "Wspaniałe miasto Amsterdam" (The wonderful city of Amsterdam)
5. "Gierek for ever"
6. "Będę śpiewał tylko ja (czyli zeznania Krzysztofa Krawczyka przed Trybunałem Stanu)" (Only I will sing, or Krzysztof Krawczyk's testimonies at the Tribunal of the State)
7. "Alkoholu pełne nieba" (Skies full of alcohol)
8. "Kręcimy pornola" (Let's make a porn)
9. "Na zadupiu" (In the jerktown)
10. "Tu nie będzie rewolucji" (There'll be no revolution)
11. "Pochwała higieny" (Praise of hygiene)
12. "Red Hot Chili Big Cyc"
13. "Pasażer" →The Passenger cover
14. "Kije baseballowe" (Baseball bats)
15. "Wykład profesora Jana Miodka" (Lecture of professor Jan Miodek)

== Credits ==
- Dżej Dżej – bass guitar, lead vocals
- Dżery – drums, vocals
- Piękny Roman – lead guitar, vocals
- Skiba – vocals, lyrics

Guest starring: Jarek Janiszewski – vocals on Pasażer

== Song issues ==
As always, Big Cyc dealt with current problems, like forced prostitution (Wspaniałe miasto Amsterdam), drunk drivers (Alkoholu pełne nieba), post-Communist leanings (Gierek for ever), or "Polish baseball without using balls" - baseball bats used as "problem-solvers". Hit single Makumba, one of the group's greatest hits, was a story of an African student in Poland, who, despite being beaten by skinheads, makes a success and stays in Poland. The second single Kręcimy pornola is about home-made pornography thought as an easy way to make money by anybody who has a camera. Lyrics of Pasażer have little in common with the Iggy Pop original. The hero of the new version is a vandal passenger who demolishes the seats in a bus. The group is also making a laugh of the recent stars - Shazza and then-returning Krzysztof Krawczyk, who, as the song says, still sings and records albums, as opposed to Elvis Presley, Jimi Hendrix and other deceased stars. The chorus, sung in a characteristic Krawczyk manner, says: "They all bite the dust, only I will sing". There are also some nonsense lyrics in Red Hot Chili Big Cyc.
