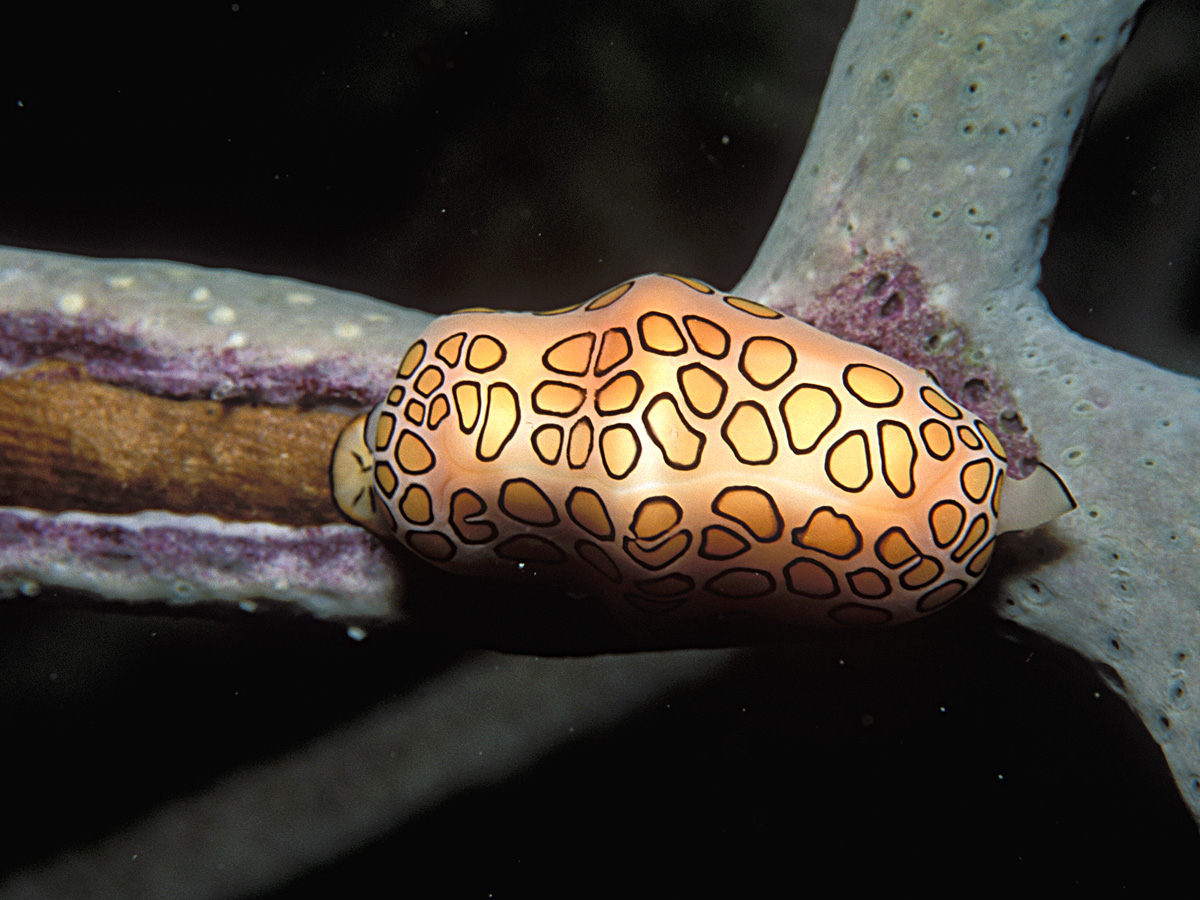
- A live individual of Cyphoma gibbosum, anterior end at the top

Scientific classification
- Kingdom: Animalia
- Phylum: Mollusca
- Class: Gastropoda
- Subclass: Caenogastropoda
- Order: Littorinimorpha
- Family: Ovulidae
- Subfamily: Simniinae
- Genus: Cyphoma; Röding, 1798

Type species
- Bulla gibbosa Linnaeus, 1758

Species
- See text

Synonyms
- Pseudocyphoma Cate, 1973

= Cyphoma =

Genus of gastropods

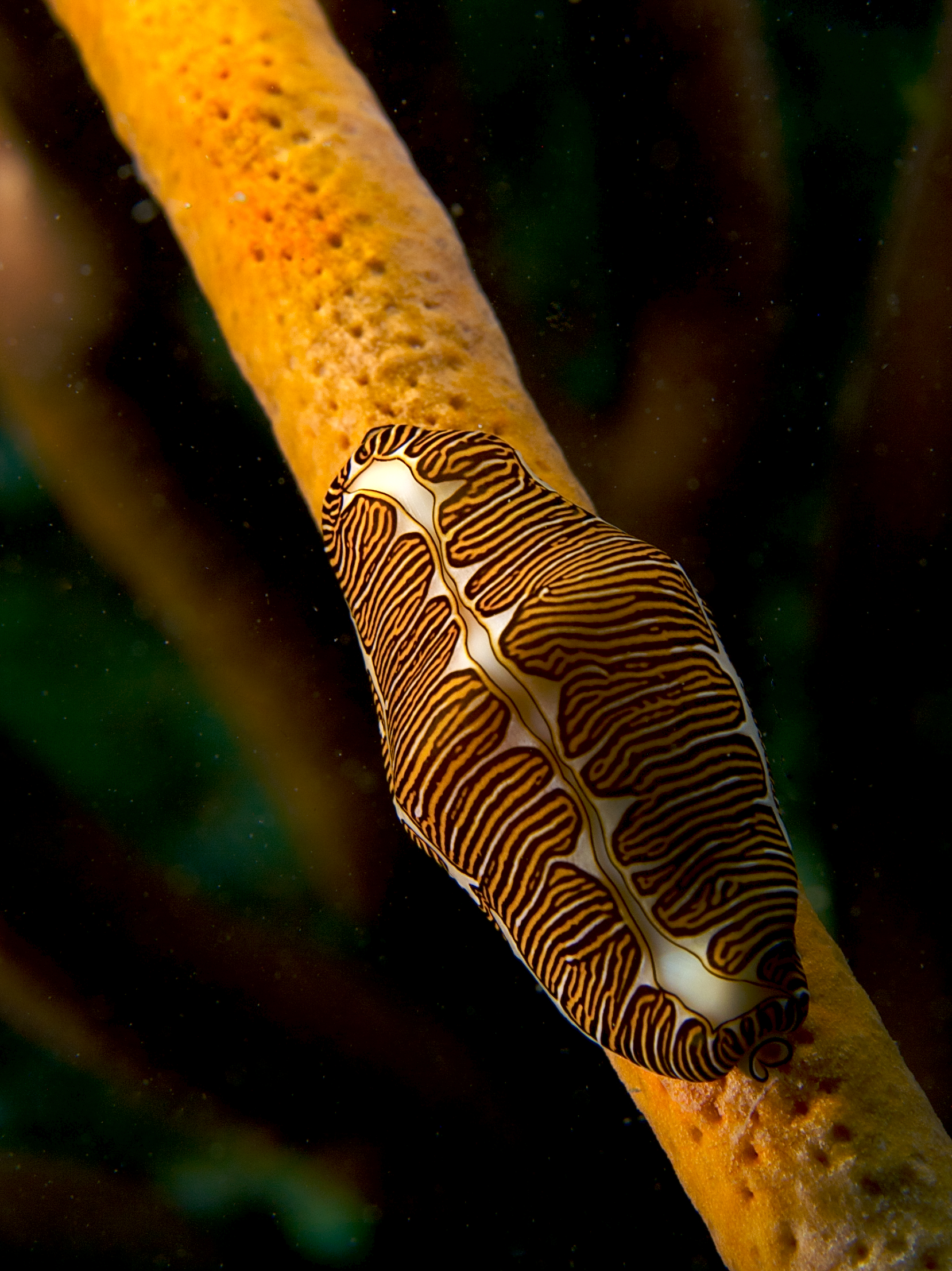
Cyphoma signatum

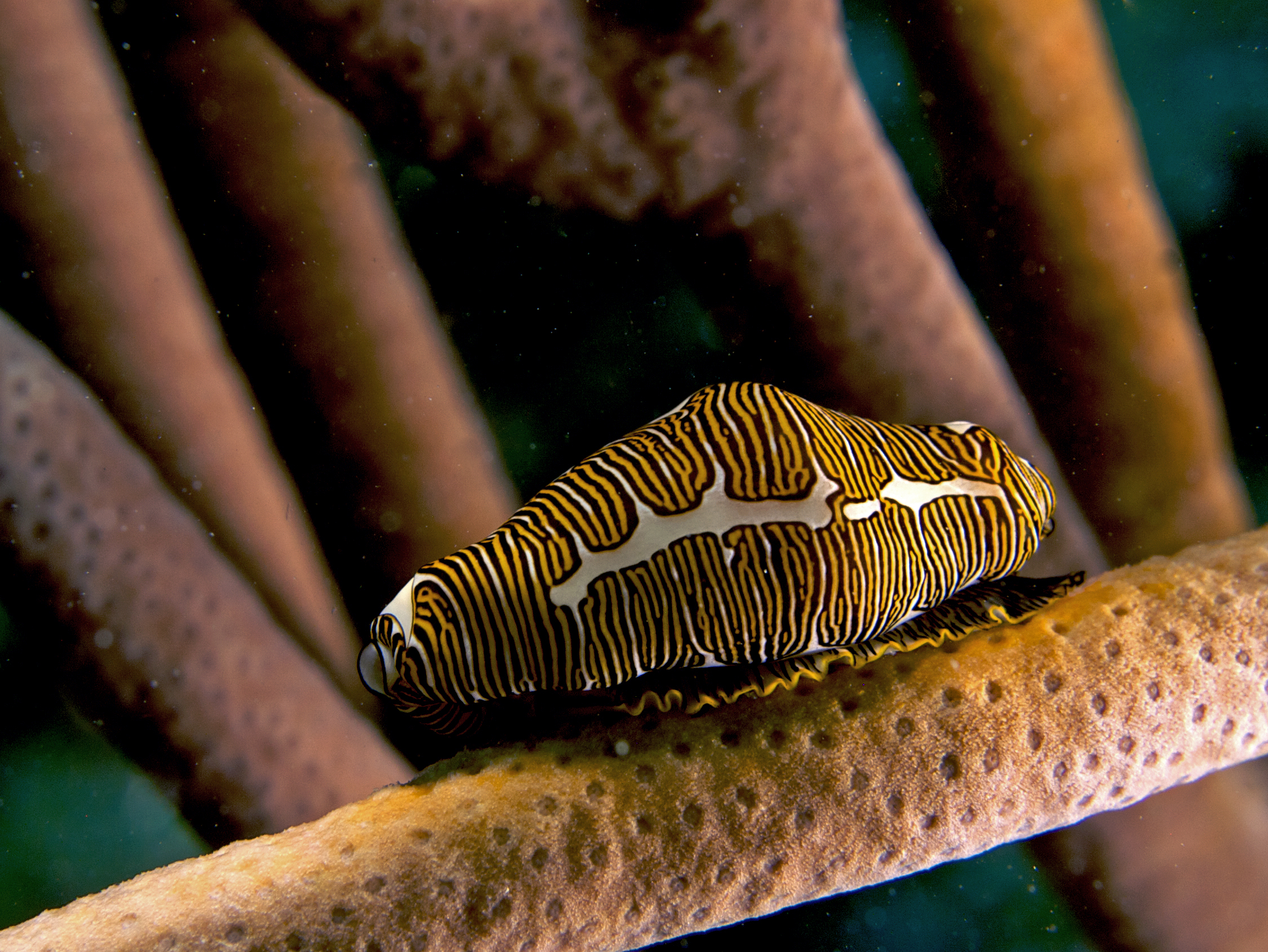
Cyphoma signatum (Fingerprint Cowry - Haiti)

Cyphoma is a genus of predatory tropical sea snails, a taxonomic group of marine gastropod molluscs in the family Ovulidae, a family which is sometimes known as the false cowries or cowry allies.

== Distribution ==
Cyphoma snails live in tropical oceans and seas.

== Habitat ==
Species in this genus live on sea whips and sea fans.

== Life habits ==
Cyphoma snails feed by grazing on the sea fans or sea whips which they inhabit.

The males can be territorial, defending part of the sea fan from encroachment by other males.

== Species ==
Species within the genus Cyphoma include:

- Cyphoma arturi Fehse, 2006
- Cyphoma aureocinctum (Dall, 1889) - gold-line cyphoma
- Cyphoma cassidyae Lorenz, 2020
- Cyphoma christahemmenae (Fehse, 1997)
- Cyphoma eludens Lorenz & J. Brown, 2015
- Cyphoma emarginatum (Sowerby I, 1830)
- Cyphoma gibbosum (Linnaeus, 1758) - flamingo tongue snail
- Cyphoma guerrinii Fehse, 2001
- Cyphoma intermedium (Sowerby I, 1828)
- Cyphoma mcgintyi Pilsbry, 1939
- Cyphoma rhomba Cate, 1979 - bullroarer cyphoma
- Cyphoma sedlaki Cate, 1979
- Cyphoma signatum Pilsbry & McGinty, 1939
- Cyphoma versicolor Fehse, 2003

Species brought into synonymy

- Cyphoma alleneae Cate, 1973: synonym of Cyphoma gibbosum (Linnaeus, 1758)
- Cyphoma aureocincta (Dall, 1889): synonym of Cyphoma aureocinctum (Dall, 1889)
- Cyphoma dorsatum Röding, 1798: synonym of Cyphoma gibbosum (Linnaeus, 1758)
- Cyphoma elongatum A. Adams, 1854: synonym of Phenacovolva recurva (Sowerby II in A. Adams & Reeve, 1848)
- Cyphoma emarginata (Sowerby I, 1830): synonym of Cyphoma emarginatum (Sowerby I, 1830)
- Cyphoma finkli Petuch, 1979: synonym of Cyphoma signata Pilsbry & McGinty, 1939: synonym of Cyphoma signatum Pilsbry & McGinty, 1939
- Cyphoma gibbosa (Linnaeus, 1758): synonym of Cyphoma gibbosum (Linnaeus, 1758)
- Cyphoma gibsonsmithorum Petuch, 1987: synonym of Cyphoma intermedium (Sowerby I, 1828)
- Cyphoma lindae Petuch, 1987: synonym of Cyphoma mcgintyi Pilsbry, 1939
- Cyphoma macumba Petuch, 1979: synonym of Cyphoma gibbosum (Linnaeus, 1758)
- Cyphoma marginata Chenu, 1859: synonym of Cyphoma emarginata (Sowerby I, 1830): synonym of Cyphoma emarginatum (Sowerby I, 1830)
- Cyphoma precursor Dall, 1897: synonym of Cyphoma gibbosum (Linnaeus, 1758)
- Cyphoma roamoralesi Macsotay & Villarroel, 2001: synonym of Cyphoma christahemmenae (Fehse, 1997)
- Cyphoma robustior Bayer, 1941: synonym of Cyphoma mcgintyi Pilsbry, 1939
- Cyphoma signata Pilsbry & McGinty, 1939: synonym of Cyphoma signatum Pilsbry & McGinty, 1939
- Cyphoma uniplicata (Sowerby II, 1849): synonym of Simnialena uniplicata (Sowerby II, 1849)
- Cyphoma viaavensis Petuch, 1986: synonym of Cyphoma rhomba Cate, 1978
