= Moherowe Berety (album) =

Album by Big Cyc

Studio album by Big Cyc
- Released: 2006
- Genre: Rock
- Length: 38:14
- Label: Universal Music Polska

Big Cyc chronology
Bombowe hity czyli the best of 1988-2004 (2002)	Moherowe Berety (2006)	Szambo i Perfumeria (2008)

Moherowe Berety was released in 2006 by Universal Music Polska. The cover of the album legally sold bearing a sticker with the slogan "CD banned in the Fourth Republic". In addition to the 12 tracks on the album, a video for the title song Moherowe Berety was recorded, funded by Sabina Kluszczyński of Heavy Vision.

== Track listing ==
1. Atakują Klony (Clones are attacking)
2. Moherowe Berety (Mohair Berets)
3. Złodzieje (Thieves)
4. Mówi Bagdad (Baghdad speaks)
5. Tajni Agenci (Secret Agents)
6. I Ty Będziesz Miał 40 Lat (And you'll be 40 years old)
7. Pechowy Jak Polak (Unlucky Like a Pole)
8. Dyktator (Dictator)
9. Bazooka
10. Błysk (Flash)
11. Mój Komputer (My Computer)
12. Granice (Borders)
