= Cyphoma rhomba =

Scientific classification
- Kingdom: Animalia
- Phylum: Mollusca
- Class: Gastropoda
- Subclass: Caenogastropoda
- Order: Littorinimorpha
- Family: Ovulidae
- Genus: Cyphoma
- Species: C. rhomba

Binomial name
- Cyphoma rhomba Cate, 1979

Synonyms
- Cyphoma viaavensis Petuch, 1986

Species of gastropod

Cyphoma rhomba is a species of sea snail in the family Ovulidae, the ovulids, cowry allies or false cowries.

== Description ==
The maximum recorded shell length is 22.7 mm.

== Habitat ==
The minimum recorded depth is 18 m. The maximum recorded depth is 18 m.
