= Cyphoma sedlaki =

Scientific classification
- Kingdom: Animalia
- Phylum: Mollusca
- Class: Gastropoda
- Subclass: Caenogastropoda
- Order: Littorinimorpha
- Family: Ovulidae
- Genus: Cyphoma
- Species: C. sedlaki

Binomial name
- Cyphoma sedlaki Cate, 1979

Species of gastropod

Cyphoma sedlaki is a species of sea snail in the family Ovulidae, the ovulids, cowry allies or false cowries.

== Description ==
The maximum recorded shell length is 26.9 mm.

== Habitat ==
It has been recorded at depths of 1.5 m.
