= Berlin Zachodni =

1990 song by Big Cyc

Song by Big Cyc

from the album Z partyjnym pozdrowieniem
- Released: 1990
- Studio: Izabelin Studio
- Genre: Punk rock
- Length: 4:51
- Label: Polskie Nagrania Muza
- Producer: Jan Lizikowski

Audio
- "Berlin Zachodni" on YouTube

"Berlin Zachodni" (Polish: [ˈbɛr.lin zaˈxɔd.ɲi]; lit. 'West Berlin') is a Polish-language punk rock song by the Poland-based rock band Big Cyc. The song was released as in 1990 and subsequently appeared the same year on the album Z partyjnym pozdrowieniem published by the record label Polskie Nagrania Muza. The song is about the black market in which the residents of the Polish People's Republic have partaken in the city of West Berlin in the late 1980s and the early 1990s.

== Production and release ==
In 1989, while the Poland-based rock band Big Cyc was perforing in West Berlin during the Schwarze Tage festival, its members have been inspired to write the song about the city, entitled "Berlin Zachodni", after they noted a high number of vendors and smugglers among people traveling there from Poland.

In 1990, the band recorded the song for their album in Izabelin Studio in the village of Izabelin B near Warsaw, Poland. It was performed by Jacek Jędrzejak and Jarosław Lis as the main vocalists with Krzysztof Skiba and Roman Lechowicz as the support vocalists. Jędrzejak and Lis also played on a bass guitar and a drum kit, respectively. Jan Lizikowski was responsible for the music production, and Andrzej Puczyński for the sound production. The music video for the song was directed by Paweł Zimnicki. Soon after, the song was played in various radio stations, including on the Polish Radio Three. Afterwards, the band signed a contract with the record label Polskie Nagrania Muza, which released their 1990 album Z partyjnym pozdrowieniem, which included "Berlin Zachodni" as the first track on the A-side.

Later, the song was also included on the band's 1994 album Nie zapomnisz nigdy, released by BMG Ariola PL.

== Reception ==
In 1990, the song reached the fourth place on the Radio Three Chart. In 1991, the song was awarded the title of the best hit song of the year in a plebiscite of the monthly hobby magazine Teraz Rock.

== Lyrics and motives ==
The song is about the black market in which the residents of the Polish People's Republic have partaken in the city of West Berlin in the late 1980s and the early 1990s. In 1989, Poland relaxed the requirements for its citizens to receive passports. While non-visa travel with it across Europe had been generally limited to the Eastern Bloc, West Berlin having a visa-free policy to all international travels, granted entry to its holders. It led to the development of a black market as people begun smuggling various produces across the border, most often alcohol and cigarettes, to sell in the city for large profits when compared to the earnings in the Eastern Bloc. The lyrics also described the travel to the city from Poland via the East Germany on a train, which were overcrowded and aggressively patrolled and searched by the East German police and customs officers. The lyric in the song "Nasza bieda nas rozgrzesza, Polski handel, Trzecia Rzesza", which translates to "Our impoverishment absolves our sins; the Third Reich, Poland's trade", the East German police and customs officers have been compared to Nazi Germany, as the band members saw them as aggressively patrolling the Polish travelers being jealous of not being able to travel to West Berlin themselves. While the majority of the songs lyrics are in Polish, it opens with a spoken sentence in German, stylised as a train announcement greeting the arrivals.

== Musical composition ==
The song features a calm verse melody driven by a lead guitar and devoid of a rhythm sections which contrasts with the lively and energetic chorus.
