= Renata Beger =

Polish politician

Member of Sejm
- In office 19 October 2001 – 4 November 2007

Personal details
- Born: 1958 (age 67–68)
- Party: Samoobrona

Renata Lidia Beger (born 18 July 1958, in Silno, Pomeranian Voivodeship) is a Polish politician, a prominent member of the populist political party Samoobrona and a member of the Sejm (lower chamber of the Polish parliament) between 2001 and 2007.

== Political career ==
Beger became a vice-chairman of the local Wielkopolska voivodship Samoobrona board in 1992, and served in that function until 2001, when she was elected to the Sejm as a representative for the Piła district. She gained some media attention, as well as became an object of ridicule, mostly due to her relatively low education for a member of Parliament (see below) and lack of experience with affairs of state, as well as devout support for her party's leader, Andrzej Lepper.

=== Rywin affair ===
Beger's gained more notoriety when she was delegated by her party to serve in a special committee set up to investigate a major corruption scandal that marred the fourth term of the Polish parliament, the Rywin affair. The committee's sittings, which included hearings of witnesses, were televised live and became some of the most publicized and discussed events in Poland at their time. Beger became notorious for her unique style of conducting those and very unusual questions, and her alleged lack of knowledge or experience in many areas the committee was dealing with.

=== Counterfeit accusation and conviction ===
During her first term in parliament, Beger was accused of counterfeiting signatures on the lists of citizens supporting her parliamentary candidacy (required to register as a candidate in Poland). In November 2003, as the issue became pursued by a prosecutor, Beger renounced her legal immunity as a member of the Sejm, as well as was expelled from the special committee in October. Formal proceedings began only in November 2004, and extended well into Beger's second term. She was formally convicted of counterfeit on 30 June 2006 and sentence of 2 years of incarceration suspended for 5 years.

=== Second term - Secret Footage ===
Despite the legal proceedings against her, Beger got reelected to Sejm riding on her acquired popularity. During the term, as a Samoobrona representative, she found herself a member of the parliamentary coalition supporting the Law and Justice party (PiS)-led governments of first Kazimierz Marcinkiewicz and then Prawo i Sprawiedliwość chairman, Jarosław Kaczyński.

The coalition was marred by tensions between its members, and finally collapsed when Andrzej Lepper, the leader of Samoobrona, repeatedly vowed that he and his party would not support the budget proposition approved by the Council of Ministers. This led to Kaczyński deposing Lepper of his post of deputy prime minister, but at the same time in need of parliamentary majority to support the government. As none of the remaining parties present in the Sejm would, or could, replace the Samoobrona in supporting Kaczyński's cabinet, PiS had to resort to convince individual Samoobrona representatives to defect from the party in order to vote in favor of the government, which led to accusations of unethical dealing on their side.

On 26 September 2006 the TVN television channel broadcast, as a part of the "Teraz My" (Now We) show, footage recorded by Beger using a hidden camera, of her in an informal conversation with government minister Adam Lipiński, discussing possible nomination Beger could receive for defecting from Samoobrona to support and remain in the government coalition. The talks, initiated by Beger, involved the possibility of acquiring a government post. Support with current legal proceedings against her, as shown on tape, were rejected by government minister Adam Lipiński.

In an opinion poll conducted immediately after the footage was revealed, 66% of the respondents defined PiS politicians' actions as "political corruption" and the same percentage demanded the Kaczyński government to resign. Beger filed a motion for prosecution against PiS. Another poll showed that 58% of Poles see the actions as a provocation of political opponents, rather than explicit "corruption".

In the 2007 early parliamentary elections, called after the final collapse of the coalition government, Samoobrona failed to pass the 5% electoral threshold, required to be represented in the Sejm. Therefore, along with her party colleagues, Renata Beger is no longer a member of the Polish parliament.

== Media personality ==
Renata Beger is one of the most known, as well as controversial, politicians in Poland, not only for her political activity, but also for her personality traits. She is often very frank in her opinions. In her first term in parliament, in an interview for the Super Express tabloid, she expanded on her sexual life with her husband, and declared she loved sex "like horse liked oats". Her attempts at formal speeches were often failed due to gaffes such as calling United Nations Secretary-General Kofi Annan Annan Kofan on TV. Beger was frequently ridiculed by satirists and some artists, including singers and bands such as Paweł Kukiz or Big Cyc recording songs devoted to her.

Beger famously skipped a sitting of her special parliamentary committee in order to attend a recording of a popular talk show as a celebrity guest. Over time, Beger became a popular celebrity, appearing in TV programmes and displaying a more cultivated image, including her participation in a charity fashion show as a model or in a TV dance show.

== Education ==
Beger formally has only basic secondary education, and did not even have the matura upon being elected for the first time. Her matura exam in 2004 was widely publicized in the media - she got a 2 (lowest passing grade) in Polish and 4 in geography. She then went on to become an extramural student of the faculty of political science at the Adam Mickiewicz University in Poznań.
