= Cyphoma emarginatum =

Scientific classification
- Kingdom: Animalia
- Phylum: Mollusca
- Class: Gastropoda
- Subclass: Caenogastropoda
- Order: Littorinimorpha
- Family: Ovulidae
- Genus: Cyphoma
- Species: C. emarginatum

Binomial name
- Cyphoma emarginatum (Sowerby I, 1830)

Synonyms
- Cyphoma emarginata (Sowerby I, 1830) (error in gender ending); Cyphoma marginata Chenu, 1859; Ovulum emarginatum Sowerby I, 1830

Species of gastropod

Cyphoma emarginatum, common name : the Emarginate Cyphoma, is a species of sea snail, a marine gastropod mollusk in the family Ovulidae, the ovulids, cowry allies or false cowries.

== Description ==
The shell size varies between 15 mm and 22 mm.

== Distribution ==
This species is distributed in the tropical Eastern Pacific Ocean.
