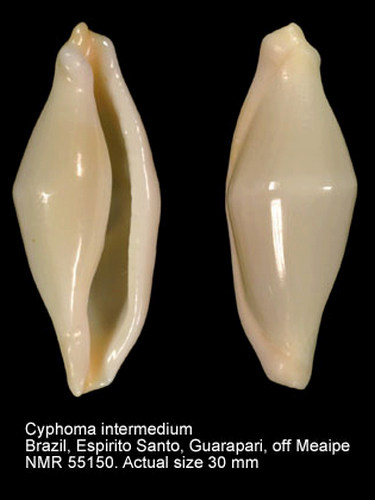

Scientific classification
- Kingdom: Animalia
- Phylum: Mollusca
- Class: Gastropoda
- Subclass: Caenogastropoda
- Order: Littorinimorpha
- Family: Ovulidae
- Genus: Cyphoma
- Species: C. intermedium

Binomial name
- Cyphoma intermedium (Sowerby I, 1828)

Synonyms
- Cyphoma gibsonsmithorum Petuch, 1987; Ovula seccato Sowerby I, 1834; Ovulum intermedia Sowerby I, 1828 (error in gender); Phenacovolva lindae Petuch, 1987; Pseudocyphoma abbotti (Cate, 1973); Pseudocyphoma intermedium (Sowerby I, 1828); Pseudocyphoma kathiewayae Cate, C.N., 1973; Pseudocyphoma gibsonsmithorum Petuch, E.J., 1987; Phenacovolva lindae Petuch, E.J., 1987; Pseudocyphoma rosenbergi Fehse, 2001

= Cyphoma intermedium =

Species of gastropod

Cyphoma intermedium, common name : intermediate egg shell, is a species of sea snail, a marine gastropod mollusk in the family Ovulidae, the ovulids, cowry allies or false cowries.

== Description ==
The shell size varies between 18 mm and 50 mm.

== Distribution ==
This species is distributed in the Caribbean Sea, the Lesser Antilles, Colombia, Venezuela, Eastern Florida, and Brazil.
