= Cyphoma christahemmenae =

Scientific classification
- Kingdom: Animalia
- Phylum: Mollusca
- Class: Gastropoda
- Subclass: Caenogastropoda
- Order: Littorinimorpha
- Family: Ovulidae
- Genus: Cyphoma
- Species: C. christahemmenae

Binomial name
- Cyphoma christahemmenae (Fehse, 1997)

Synonyms
- Cyphoma roamorales Macsotay & Campos Villarroel, 2001; Pseudocyphoma christahemmenae Fehse, 1997 (original combination)

Species of gastropod

Cyphoma christahemmenae is a species of sea snail in the family Ovulidae, the ovulids, cowry allies or false cowries.

== Description ==
The maximum recorded shell length is 31.4 mm.

== Habitat ==
Minimum recorded depth is 16 m. Maximum recorded depth is 30 m.
