= Cyphoma aureocinctum =

Scientific classification
- Kingdom: Animalia
- Phylum: Mollusca
- Class: Gastropoda
- Subclass: Caenogastropoda
- Order: Littorinimorpha
- Family: Ovulidae
- Genus: Cyphoma
- Species: C. aureocinctum

Binomial name
- Cyphoma aureocinctum (Dall, 1889)

Synonyms
- Cyphoma aureocincta (Dall, 1899) (error in gender ending); Pseudocyphoma aereocinctum (Dall, 1899); Simnia aureocincta Dall, 1899

Species of gastropod

Cyphoma aureocinctum, common name : the gold-banded egg shell, is a species of sea snail, a marine gastropod mollusc in the family Ovulidae, the ovulids, cowry allies or false cowries.

== Distribution ==
This species occurs in the Atlantic Ocean along Cape Verde, West Africa, Southeast USA and Brazil.

== Description ==
The shell size varies between 16 mm and 27 mm.

The maximum recorded shell length is 18.5 mm.

== Habitat ==
Minimum recorded depth is 123 m. Maximum recorded depth is 128 m.
