= Cyphoma arturi =

Scientific classification
- Kingdom: Animalia
- Phylum: Mollusca
- Class: Gastropoda
- Subclass: Caenogastropoda
- Order: Littorinimorpha
- Family: Ovulidae
- Genus: Cyphoma
- Species: C. arturi

Binomial name
- Cyphoma arturi Fehse, 2006

Species of gastropod

Cyphoma arturi is a species of sea snail in the family Ovulidae, the ovulids, cowry allies or false cowries.
