= Cyphoma macumba =

Scientific classification
- Kingdom: Animalia
- Phylum: Mollusca
- Class: Gastropoda
- Subclass: Caenogastropoda
- Order: Littorinimorpha
- Family: Ovulidae
- Genus: Cyphoma
- Species: C. macumba

Binomial name
- Cyphoma macumba Petuch, 1979

Species of gastropod

Cyphoma macumba is a species of sea snail, a marine gastropod mollusk in the family Ovulidae, the ovulids, cowry allies or false cowries.

This species has become an (uncertain) synonym of Cyphoma gibbosum (Linnaeus, 1758)

== Distribution ==
Endemic to Brazil - from Ceará to Rio de Janeiro State (belonged to the Bahian Subprovince, including Abrolhos archipelago, according to Petuch, 2013).

== Description ==
The maximum recorded shell length is 32.5 mm.

== Habitat ==
Minimum recorded depth is 2 m. Maximum recorded depth is 10 m.
