= Krzysztof Rutkowski =

Polish entrepreneur, owner of a detective agency

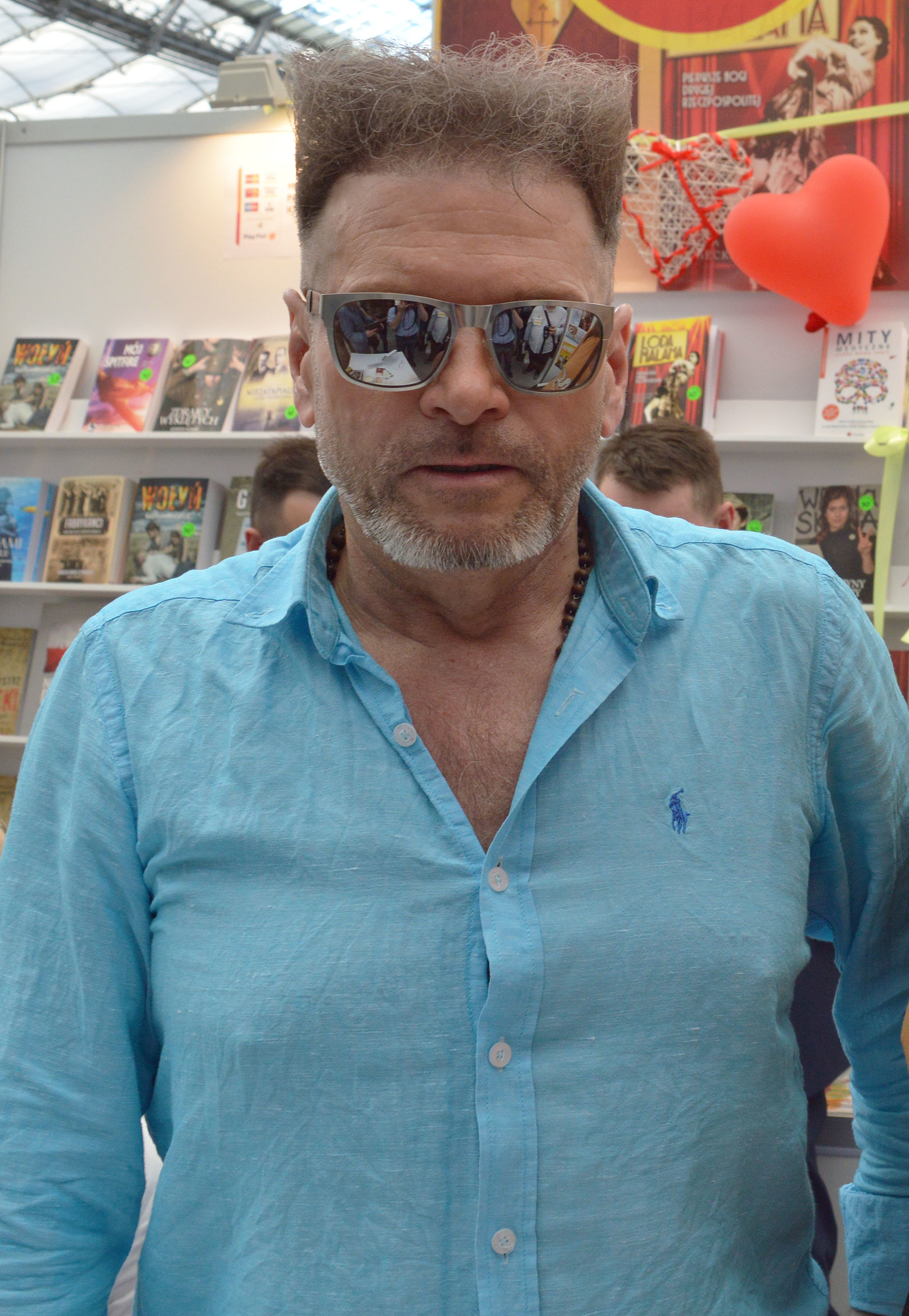
Krzysztof Rutkowski, 2017

Krzysztof Rutkowski (born 6 April 1960 in Teresin near Sochaczew, Poland) is a Polish former private detective (his licence has been suspended in 2006 and revoked in 2010), criminal, ex-politician in European parliament (Partia Ludowo-Demokratyczna), occasional actor and Reality TV celebrity.

Rutkowski himself claims to be the most renowned Polish private detective. He began his career specializing in finding and returning stolen vehicles and works of art. Later he was convicted and imprisoned for money laundering.

Rutkowski also took part in many TV footages and popularized shows like the Detektyw series of the TVN station, which depicts the life and methods of a private detective.

His company is supposed to be also involved in illegal union busting activities against truckers of Polish logistics companies.

== Political career ==
Krzysztof Rutkowski was a Polish politician who has held various positions throughout his career. In the 2001 parliamentary elections, he was elected to the Sejm of the 4th term on behalf of Self-Defence of the Republic of Poland, receiving 13,946 votes. He left the party and parliamentary club in December 2001 and later joined the People's Democratic Party, Federative Parliamentary Club, and Economic Party parliamentary groups. Rutkowski worked in the Administration and Home Affairs Committee and the Culture and Media Committee. He was an observer from 2003 to 2004 and a Member of the European Parliament of the 5th term from May to July 2004, serving on the Committee on Foreign Affairs, Human Rights, Common Security, and Defense Policy.

Rutkowski unsuccessfully ran in the 2004 European Parliament elections and the 2005 Sejm elections. He was an advisor to the Mayor of Łódź, Jerzy Kropiwnicki, for security issues from 2002 to 2006. In 2008, he registered as an independent candidate in the supplementary elections to the Senate in the Krosno constituency, receiving 357 votes and taking 10th place out of 12 candidates.

== Unlawful detective activity and kidnappings ==
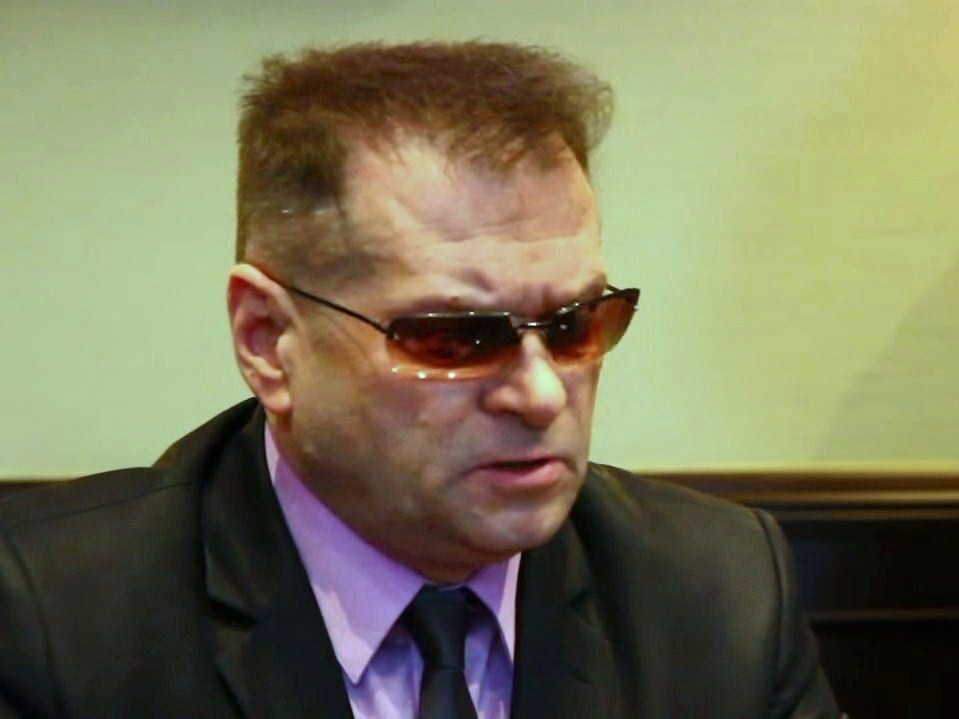
Krzysztof Rutkowski, 2012

In 2002 Rutkowski overpowered the suspected Polish criminal Dawid S. in a hotel in Český Těšín in northern Moravia and, using his diplomatic passport, brought him unmolested across the border into Poland. The methods used by Rutkowski met with harsh criticism in the Czech Republic.

Starting in 2005, after his political career, Rutkowski became active as a so-called "private detective" and was not stopped by the fact that he had already come into conflict with the law on several occasions and was convicted, among other things, of unlawful detective work and kidnapping.

Officers from the Polish State Security Agency (ABW) arrested Rutkowski in 2007 when he stopped his BMW at a gas station in Katowice. He was suspected of usurpation of office and aiding and abetting money laundering. Rutkowski was an “advisor” to an illegal fuel producer who is said to have defrauded the state of the equivalent of more than 100 million euros and had been in prison for three years and had testified about previous accomplices.

In 2012, the Berlin Daily BZ reported an incident: men dressed in black with "Rutkowski Patrol" badges allegedly tried to drag a Polish-born woman with a German passport into a limousine against her will on a street in Berlin. The suspected kidnapper is said to have been private detective Rutkowski, apparently hired by the young woman's father, according to BZ.

In an incident on 7 April 2023 (Good Friday) at the Gräfenhausen motorway rest area in Germany, the owner of Polish trucking company Agmaz & Luk Maz reportedly hired Rutkowski's organization to forcibly end a strike by truck drivers. Rutkowski's men arrived at the scene in armoured-like vehicles and wearing bulletproof vests, intending to intimidate the striking drivers and potentially seize the trucks by force. The police intervened and temporarily arrested 18 people, including Rutkowski's men. A spokesman for the German trade union confederation said it was a "shame" that Rutkowski's gang could come to Germany unhindered and threaten people.

== Repatriation of Polish 9-year old from Norway ==
In June 2011, Rutkowski led a group of civilians who freed a 9-year old Polish girl from the custody of Norwegian authorities, and repatriated her. Reactions included Khalid Skah's comment that "Now Norwegian authorities can taste their own medicine." Skah has had two of his children freed by a group of Norwegians including commando/Lieutenant Commander T.A.Bolle.

In December 2011, a Polish court ruled that the child would not be sent back to Norway.

== Repatriation of a Russian-born teenager from Norway ==
A Russian-born teenager arrived in Russia in November 2011, after Rutkowski removed him from the custody of Norwegian authorities and transferred him to Poland.
