= Silno, Pomeranian Voivodeship =

Silno
- Village
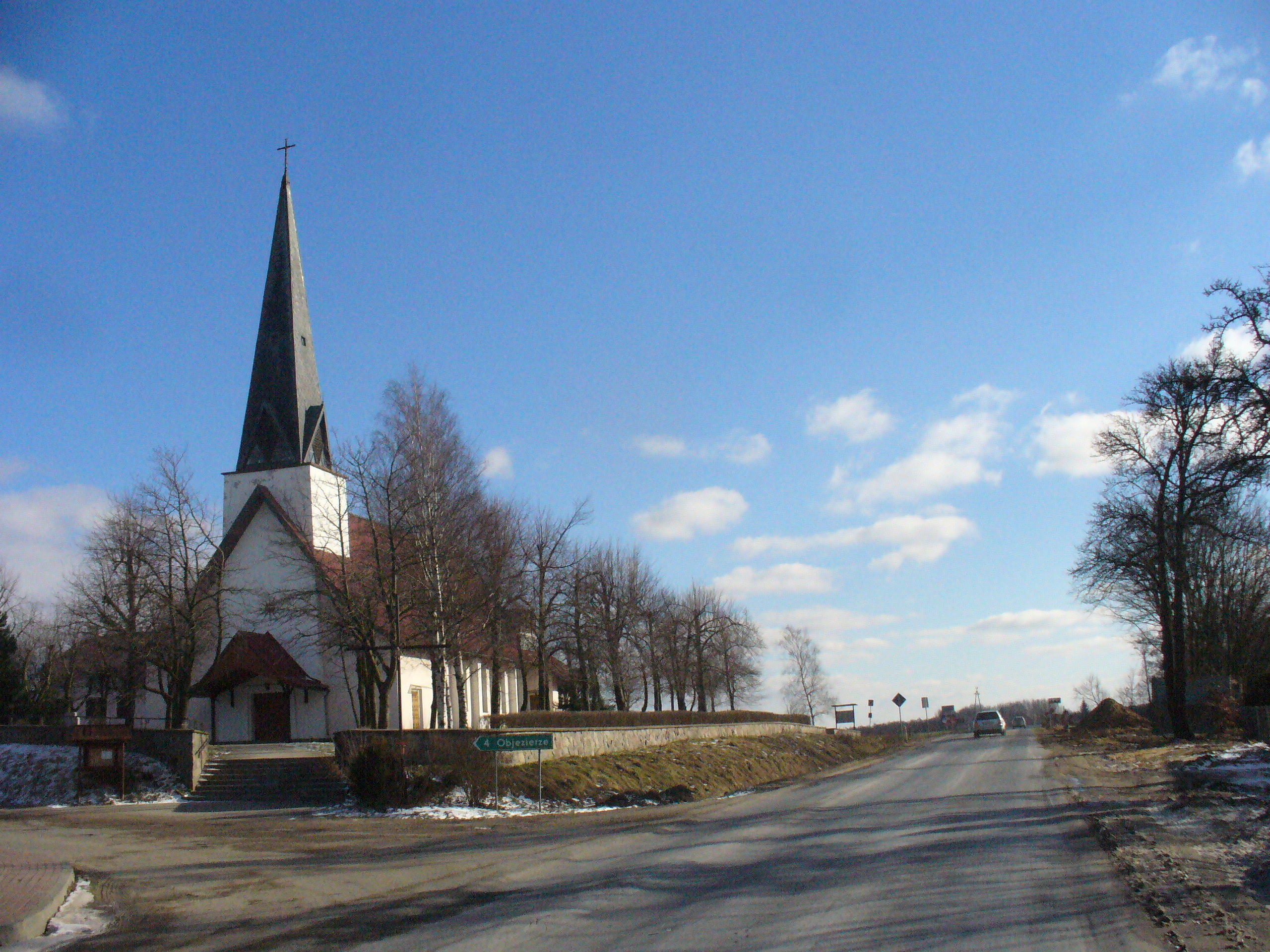
- Church of the Immaculate Heart of the Virgin Mary

- Location within Poland
- Coordinates: 53°38′48″N 17°42′16″E
- Country: Poland
- Voivodeship: Pomeranian
- County: Chojnice
- Gmina: Chojnice

Population
  - Total: 1,055
- Time zone: UTC+1 (CET)
  - Summer (DST): UTC+2 (CEST)
- Vehicle registration: GCH

Silno [ˈɕilnɔ] is a village in the administrative district of Gmina Chojnice, within Chojnice County, Pomeranian Voivodeship, in northern Poland. It is located within the historic region of Pomerania.

Silno was a royal village of the Polish Crown, administratively located in the Tuchola County in the Pomeranian Voivodeship.

== Notable people ==
- Renata Beger, Polish politician
