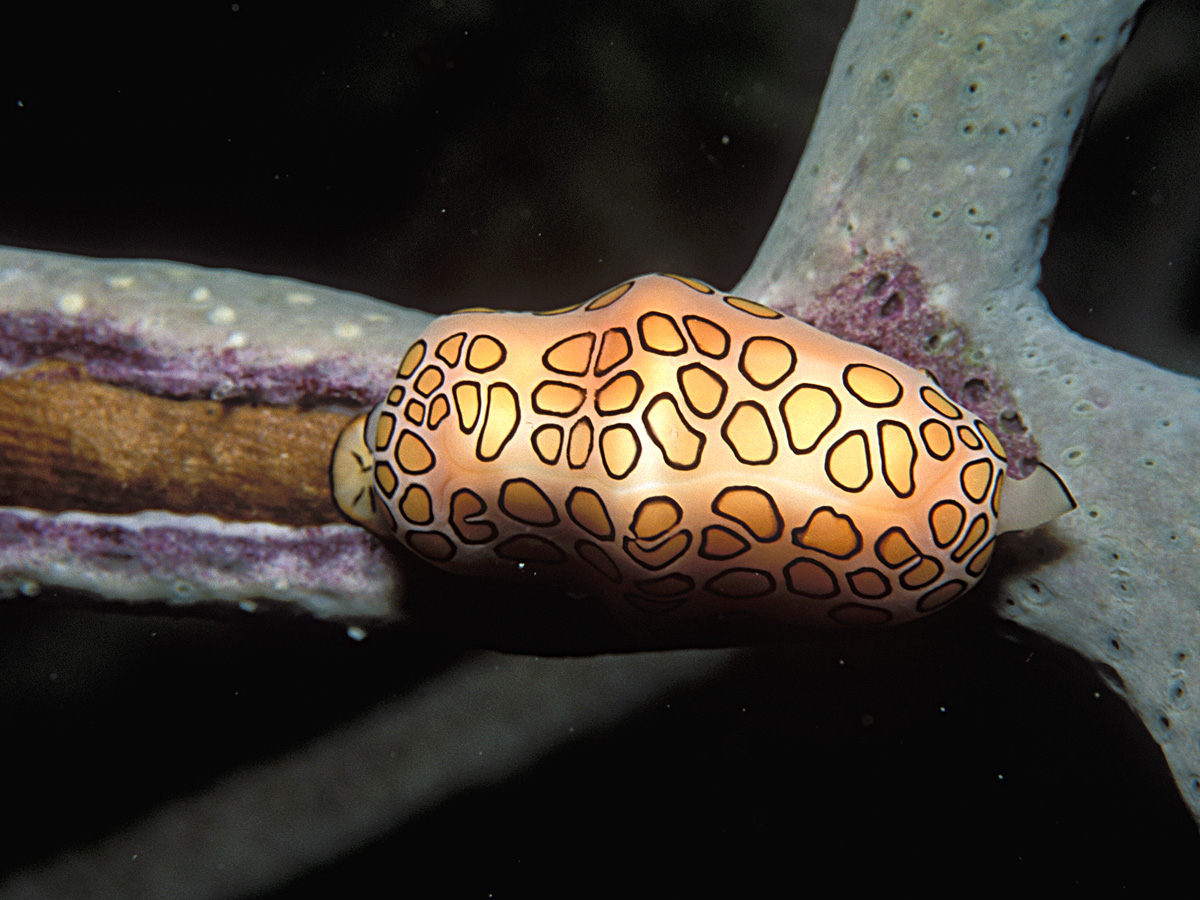
- Feeding on a soft coral; the siphon is visible at the top, and the tip of the tail is visible at the bottom. A large skid mark is visible as a brown stripe on the coral. These snails are pink and orange.
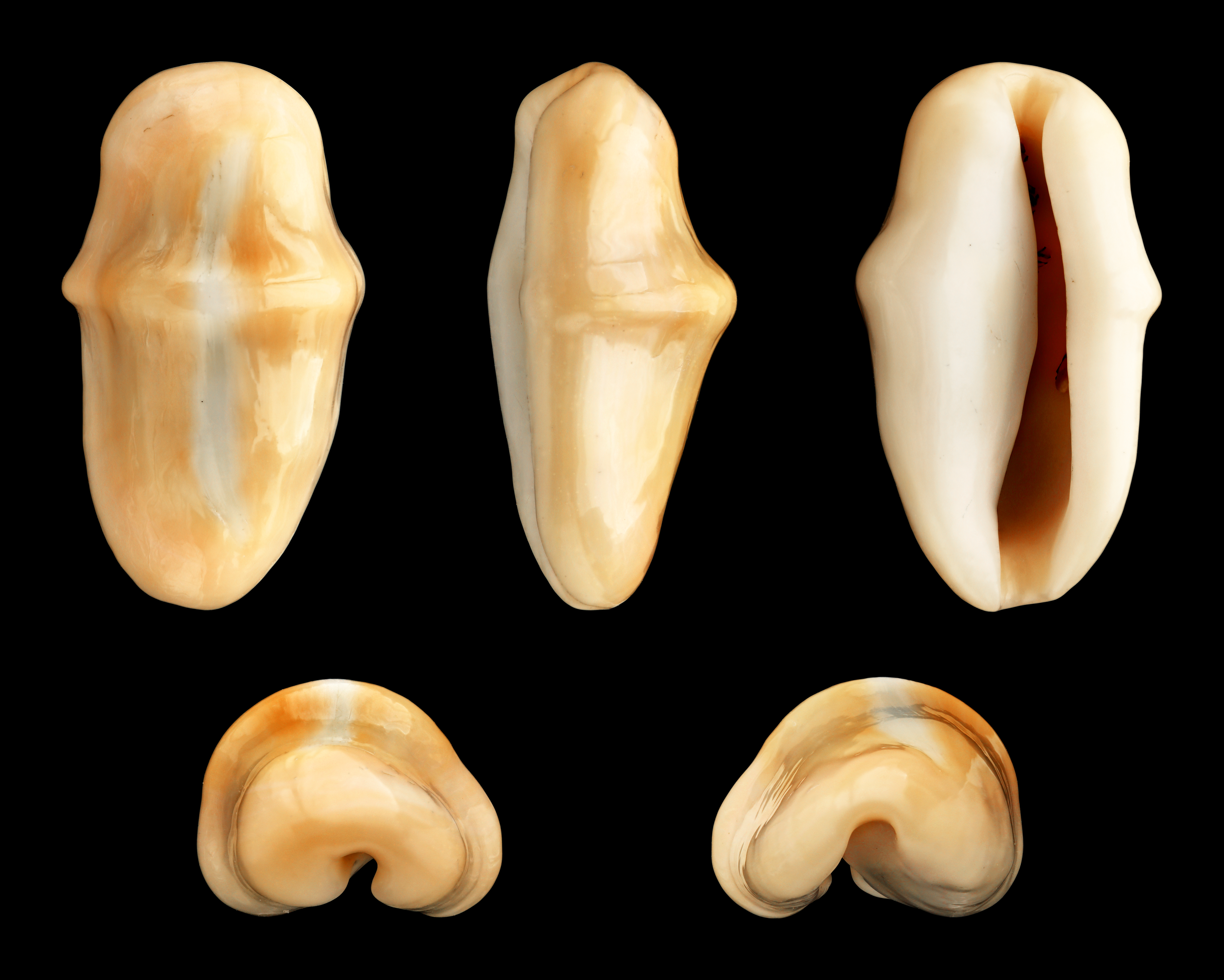
- Five views of a shell of Cyphoma gibbosum (Linné, 1758)

Scientific classification
- Kingdom: Animalia
- Phylum: Mollusca
- Class: Gastropoda
- Subclass: Caenogastropoda
- Order: Littorinimorpha
- Family: Ovulidae
- Genus: Cyphoma
- Species: C. gibbosum

Binomial name
- Cyphoma gibbosum (Linnaeus, 1758)

Synonyms
- List: Bulla gibbosa Linnaeus, 1758; Cyphoma alleneae Cate, 1973; Cyphoma dorsatum Röding, 1798; Cyphoma finkli Petuch, 1979; Cyphoma gibbosa (Linnaeus, 1758) (error in gender ending); Cyphoma lindae Petuch, 1987; Cyphoma macumba Petuch, 1979 (uncertain synonym); Cyphoma mcgintyi Pilsbry, 1939; Cyphoma precursor Dall, 1897; Cyphoma robustior Bayer, 1941; Cyphoma signata Pilsbry & McGinty, 1939 (error in gender ending); Cyphoma signatum Pilsbry & McGinty, 1939; Ovula pharetra Perry, 1811; Ovula rostrata Mörch, 1877

= Flamingo tongue snail =

Species of gastropod

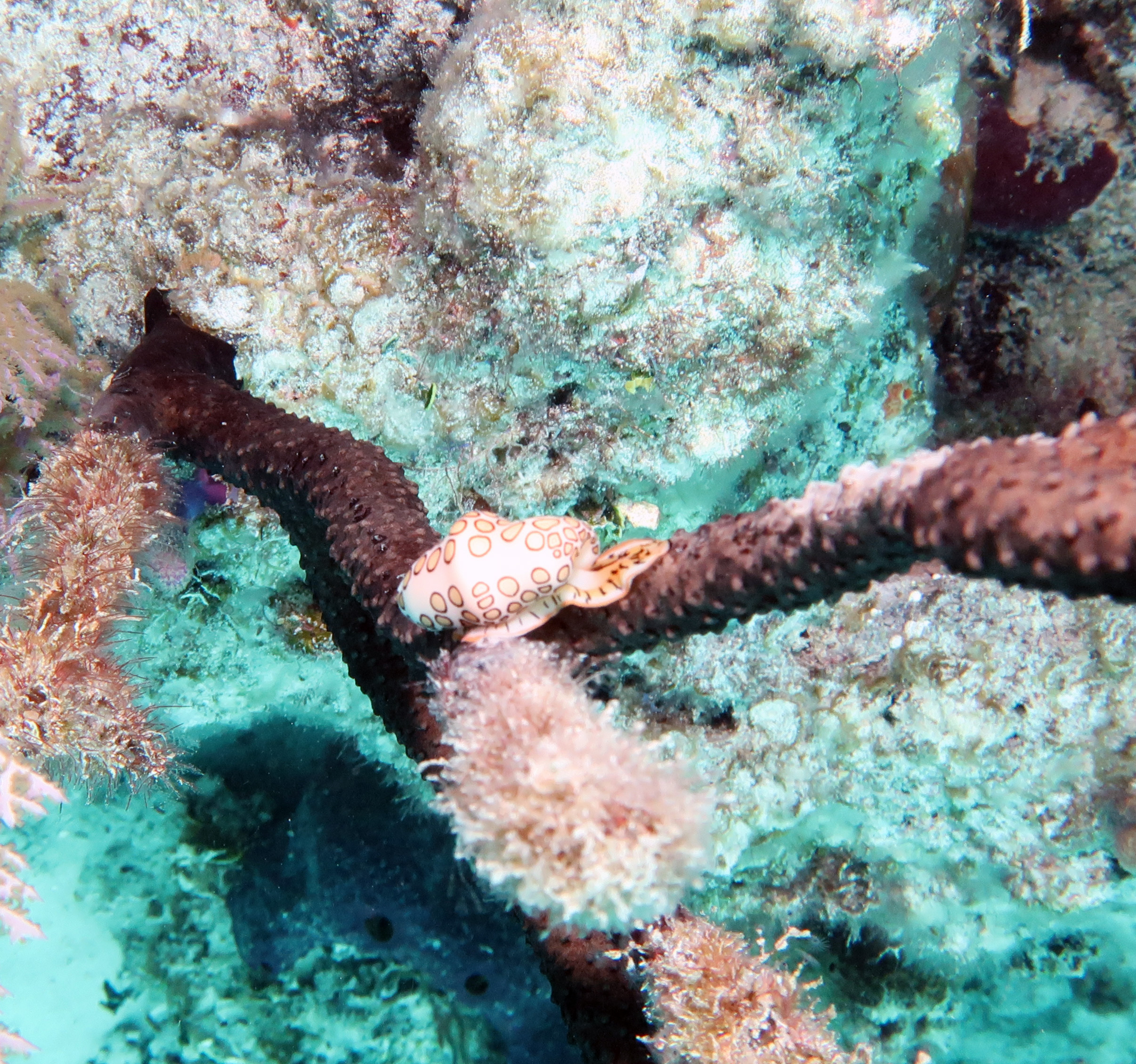
Flamingo Tongue Snail with part of its body out of the shell

The flamingo tongue snail (Cyphoma gibbosum) is a species of small but brightly colored sea snail, a marine gastropod mollusk in the family Ovulidae, the ovulids, cowry allies or false cowries.

== Taxonomy ==
A 2017 DNA analysis confirmed that Cyphoma signatum and Cyphoma mcgintyi are genetically homogenous with Cyphoma gibbosum, and that each type are morphological variations of a single species.

== Description ==
Alive, the snail appears bright orange-yellow in color with black markings. However, these colors are not in the shell, but are only due to live mantle tissue which usually covers the shell. The mantle flaps can be retracted, exposing the shell, but this usually happens only when the animal is attacked.

The shells reach on average 25–35 mm (0.98–1.38 in) of length, with a minimum size of 18 mm (0.71 in) and a maximum shell length of 45 mm (1.8 in). The shape is usually elongated and the dorsum shows a thick transversal ridge. The dorsum surface is smooth and shiny and may be white or orange, with no markings at all except a longitudinal white or cream band. The base and the interior of a C. gibbosum shell is white or pinkish, with a wide aperture.

== Distribution and habitat ==
This is the most common of several species in the genus Cyphoma, which lives in the tropical waters of the western Atlantic Ocean from North Carolina to northern coast of Brazil, including off Bermuda, in the Caribbean Sea and the Gulf of Mexico, and off the Lesser Antilles.

The minimum recorded depth is 0.3 m, and the maximum recorded depth is 90 m.

== Ecology ==
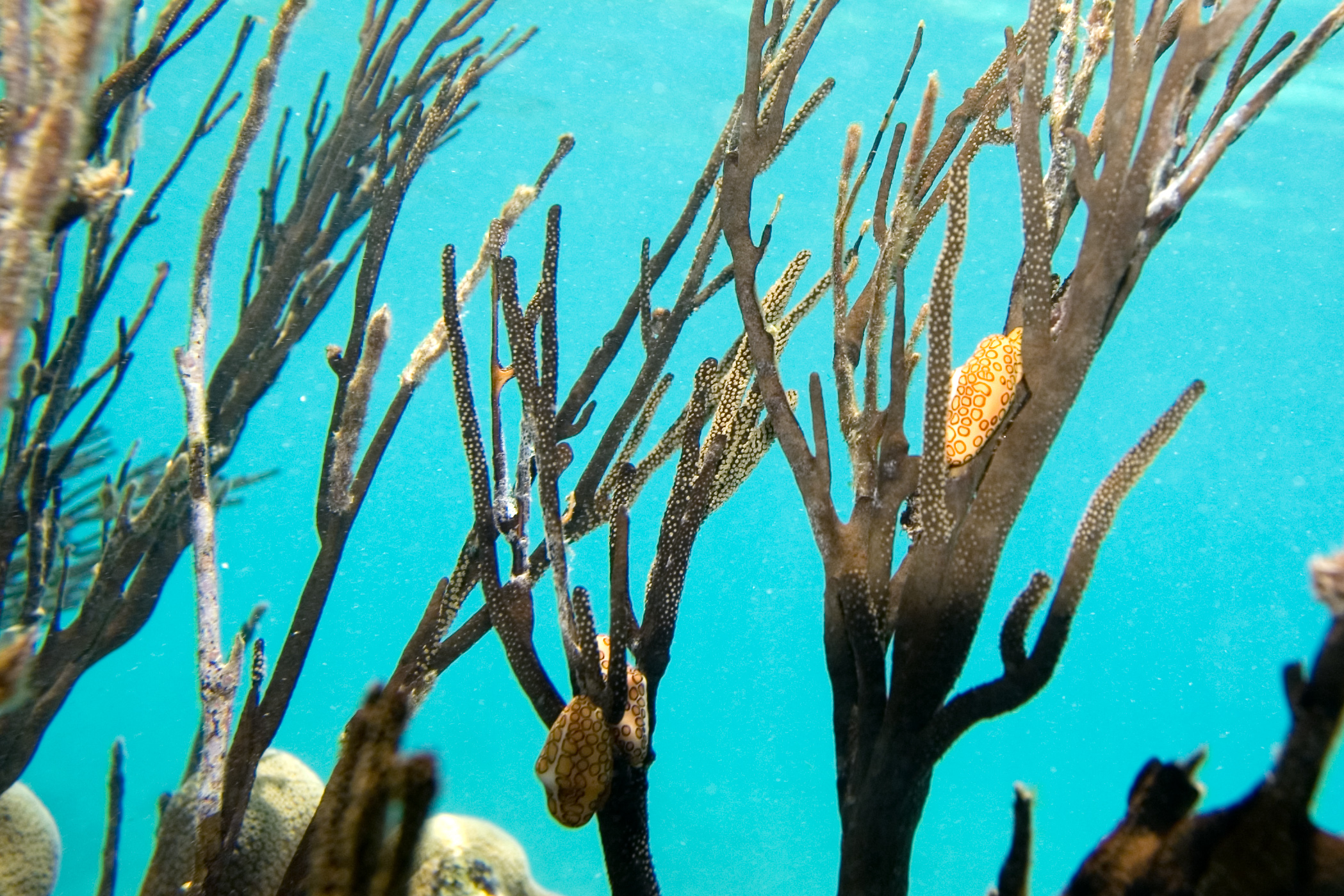
Flamingo tongue on a sea rod

The minimum recorded depth is at the surface, and the maximum recorded depth is 29 m.

The flamingo tongue snail feeds by browsing on the living tissues of the soft corals on which it lives. Common prey include Briareum spp., Gorgonia spp., Plexaura spp., and Plexaurella spp. Adult females of C. gibbosum attach eggs to coral which they have recently fed upon. After roughly 10 days, the larvae hatch. They are planktonic and eventually settle onto other gorgonian corals. Juveniles tend to remain on the underside of coral branches, while adults are far more visible and mobile. An adult scrapes the polyps off the coral with its radula, leaving an easily visible feeding scar on the coral. However, the corals can regrow the polyps, so predation by C. gibbosum is generally not lethal.

== Conservation status ==
This species used to be common, but it has become rather uncommon in heavily visited areas because of over-collecting by snorkelers and scuba divers, who make the mistake of thinking that the bright colors are in the shell of the animal.
