= Big Cyc =

Polish rock band

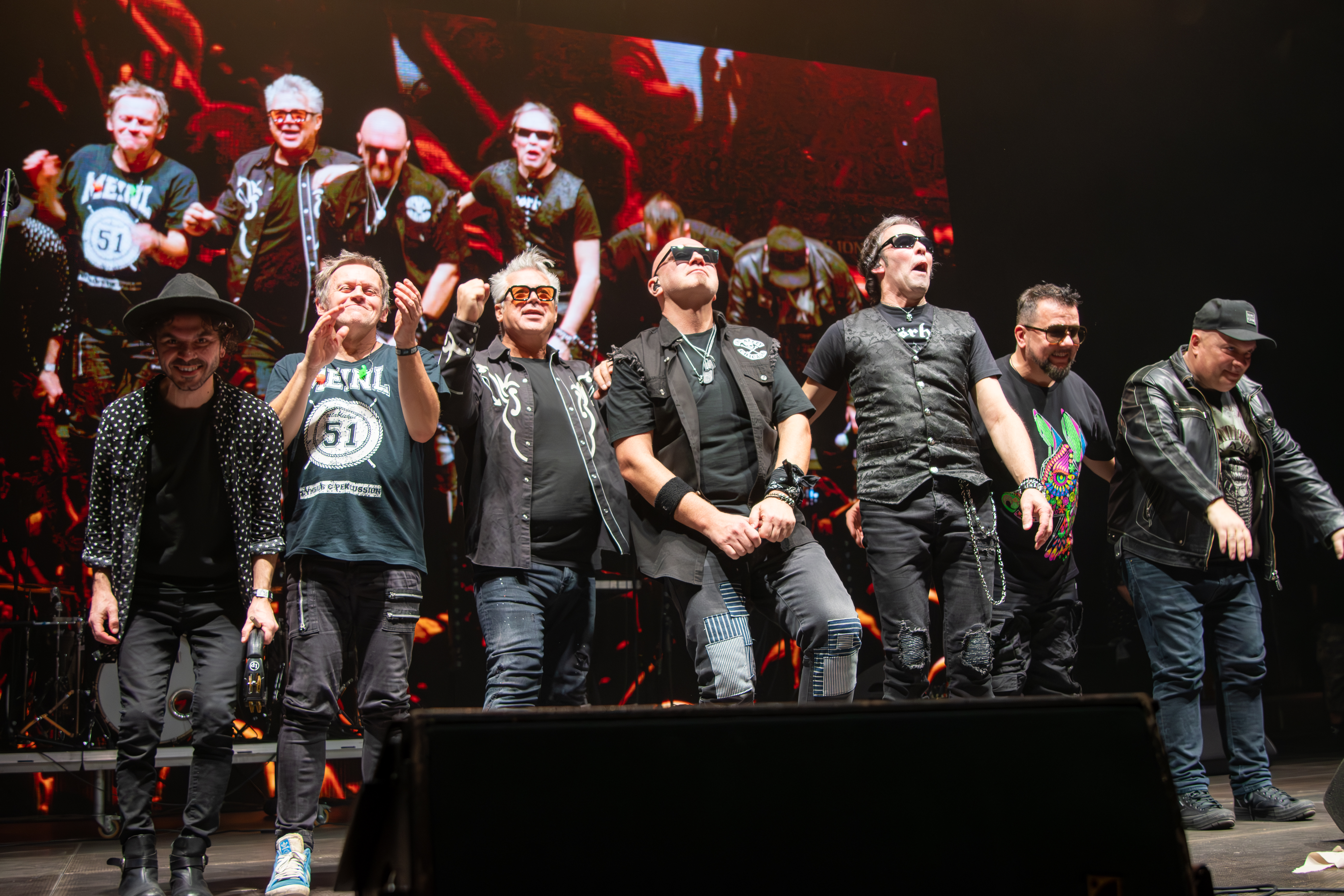
- Big Cyc in 2025

Background information
- Origin: Łódź, Łódź Voivodeship, Gdańsk, Ostrów Wielkopolski
- Genres: Punk rock Ska; Hard rock Pastiche; Comedy Rock
- Years active: 1988–present
- Labels: Sony BMG Music Entertainment Poland, Universal Music Poland
- Members: Jacek Jędrzejak (Dżej Dżej); Jarosław Lis (Dżery); Roman Lechowicz (Piękny Roman); Krzysztof Skiba; Piotr Sztajdel (Gadak)
- Past members: Robert Rejewski
- Website: Official Site

Big Cyc ("Cyc" is Polish for "Tit") is a Polish rock band formed in March 1988.

The band is well known in Poland for their controversial behaviour. The cover of their first album, Z partyjnym pozdrowieniem (Polish for With a Party Greeting), was an image of Vladimir Lenin with a Mohawk hairstyle. The title of their second album, Nie wierzcie elektrykom (Don't Trust Electricians) refers to the Polish president Lech Wałęsa, an electrician by profession. Their fourth album cover, Wojna plemników (War of Spermatozoons) featured a nun drying condoms on a clothes line. In May 1999, the band leader Krzysztof Skiba was charged with indecent exposure and fined the equivalent of US$308 for mooning the Polish prime minister Jerzy Buzek during a festival in February 1999.

== History ==
The members of Big Cyc met at the University of Łódź. Jędrzejak played guitar in a student reggae band called Rokosz (laureate of the Golden Ten during the Jarocin Festival), Skiba performed in student theatre Pstrąg and in many school cabarets, also co-creating street happenings named “The Orange Alternative”. In 1988 Rokosz broke up, and Jędrzejak wanted to create a new rock band. In this new group such artists as Jarosław Lis (drums), Roman Lechowicz (guitar) and Robert Rejewski (vocal) performed. After some time, Rejewski was replaced by Skiba, who introduced a significant creative potential. Jędrzejak, Lis, Skiba, and Lechowicz became the four of Big Cyc. The members of the band took pseudonyms: Dżej Dżej (Polish for JJ, Jędrzejak), Dżery (Polish for Jerry, Lis), and Piękny Roman (Polish for Pretty Roman, Lechowicz). Skiba remained with his own name.

In March 1988 the student club and hostel number 2 Balbina housed the first show of Big Cyc, during a cultural event Uroczysta akademia na cześć 75-lecia wynalezienia damskiego biustonosza (A solemn ceremony to celebrate the 75th anniversary of invention of women's brassiere). The nationwide media were invited (among others): Teleexpress, Polish Radio Channel 3), and the cabaret performance was introduced by Piotr Trzaskalski, then a student.

Big Cyc made many successful songs, and in 1990 in a new political environment - after Solidarity's victory and the fall of communism in Poland - they published their first album, With the Party’s salutations. 12 hits in lambada-hardcore style. The album contained hilarious poetics mocking the atmosphere of the late PRL (Polish People's Republic) - which the title and the cover – Lenin’s portrait with punk-like mohawk – bear witness to. The record introduced such well-known compositions as: "Piosenka góralska", "Berlin Zachodni" (reminiscences from first performances in Western society) and "Ballada o smutnym skinie". It became a hit in Poland, and in short time Big Cyc became well known in the country. Soon after, the band played part in the film named The Chemical Weapon, devoted to life and creative activity of the group, accomplished by independent creators team Garage-Film.

The following records never caused such sensation as the debut. The authors precisely stigmatized Polish reality, but the music background was weaker and less innovative. The second one, Nie wierzcie elektrykom (“Don't Believe Electricians”) (1991) carried a prophecy of Lech Wałęsa’s failed presidency, the third Miłość, muzyka, mordobicie (“Love, music, brawl”) (1992), brought an ironic critic of the musical environment – the Jarocin Festival. The Fourth record, Wojna plemników (“War of spermatozoons”) (1993) was condemned by members of the Catholic party ZChN (National-Christian Union) for moral boldness and provoking cover. Nie zapomnisz nigdy “You'll never forget” from 1994 was a collection of the greatest hits and some new songs, among which “It’s for you my brother” can be stated as a bands ideological hymn. Subsequent one, Golonka, flaki i inne przysmaki (“Pig Knuckles, Intestines and Other Delicacies”) (1995) became a sneer of the pseudo-grunge wave and TV-commercial culture (“Hairdresser drama”).

Successive songs and albums of Big Cyc took a sarcastic look on the reality of Polish politics and people. Often in ironic manner, the songs expose issues like problems of Polish youth, economic disproportions, drug addiction, or silliness of TV commercials. In 1996, Big Cyc published their seventh album, called Z gitarą wśród zwierząt (With guitar among animals), which contains the most famous song in history of the band, Makumba, the stereotypical story of an African student in Poland. In that period the musicians ridiculed but also bitterly commented their world. They didn’t fail to notice new social phenomena: growing disproportions in wealth, clericalism, corruption, formation of gangs and mafia in Poland, and contrasted it with freedom and neutrality of the young people. Another vocalist, Jarosław Janiszewski from “Bielizna”, appeared in this record, and soon he created a parallel band, named “Czarno-Czarni”, with the members of Big Cyc.

Celebrating the 9th anniversary in 1997 the band introduced subsequent record, with quite shocking title: Pierwsza komunia, drugie śniadanie, trzecia Rzeczpospolita (“First Communion, second breakfast, third Rzeczpospolita”), was chosen by the public present. Wszyscy święci (“All saints”) (1998), based on texts of a dead poet Wiesław Dymny, proved to be an interesting experiment. Two subsequent records: Świat według Kiepskich (“World according to Kiepscy”) (2000) and Zmień z nami płeć (“Change your sex with us”) (2001) were less popular. Nevertheless the texts of do not lose their inner sharpness and validity, they ridiculed pop-folk fashion or the dres dressing tendency. Świat według Kiepskich, was named after a Polish sitcom of the same name. Recently the politics have returned as the major subject of their satires—the “golden braid” concerning Renata Beger, the member of the Sejm (Polish parliament), the “Mohair berets” a satire on Polish government elected in 2005 and a commentary on vocal older generation in Poland, viewed by many younger people as old-fashioned, or criticizing the president of Belarus—Alexander Lukashenko. With the release of Czarne Słońce Narodu in 2016 came the song "Antoni Wzywa do Broni" ("Antoni Calls to Arms"), a song about Antoni Macierewicz, Poland's Minister of National Defence, and Smolensk. It sparked heated arguments across the internet.

The band has never forgotten about its happening origin. Several times it managed to present, in an unconventional way, the absurd and disabilities of public life. The musicians had chained themselves to radiators in publishing house “Polish Records”, protesting against unwillingness to pay artist’s royalty, they have eaten tax forms (along with politician Janusz Korwin-Mikke) fighting with too high taxes, and they protested under the Minister of Culture’s cabinet unmasking partiality of the financial politics.

Some time ago a new member joined, Piotr Sztajdel Gadak, as keyboard player. Jan Borysewicz, Marek Piekarczyk, Paweł "Konjo" Konnak, Wiesława Warszawska and Viganna Papina also have had a chance to perform with Big Cyc.

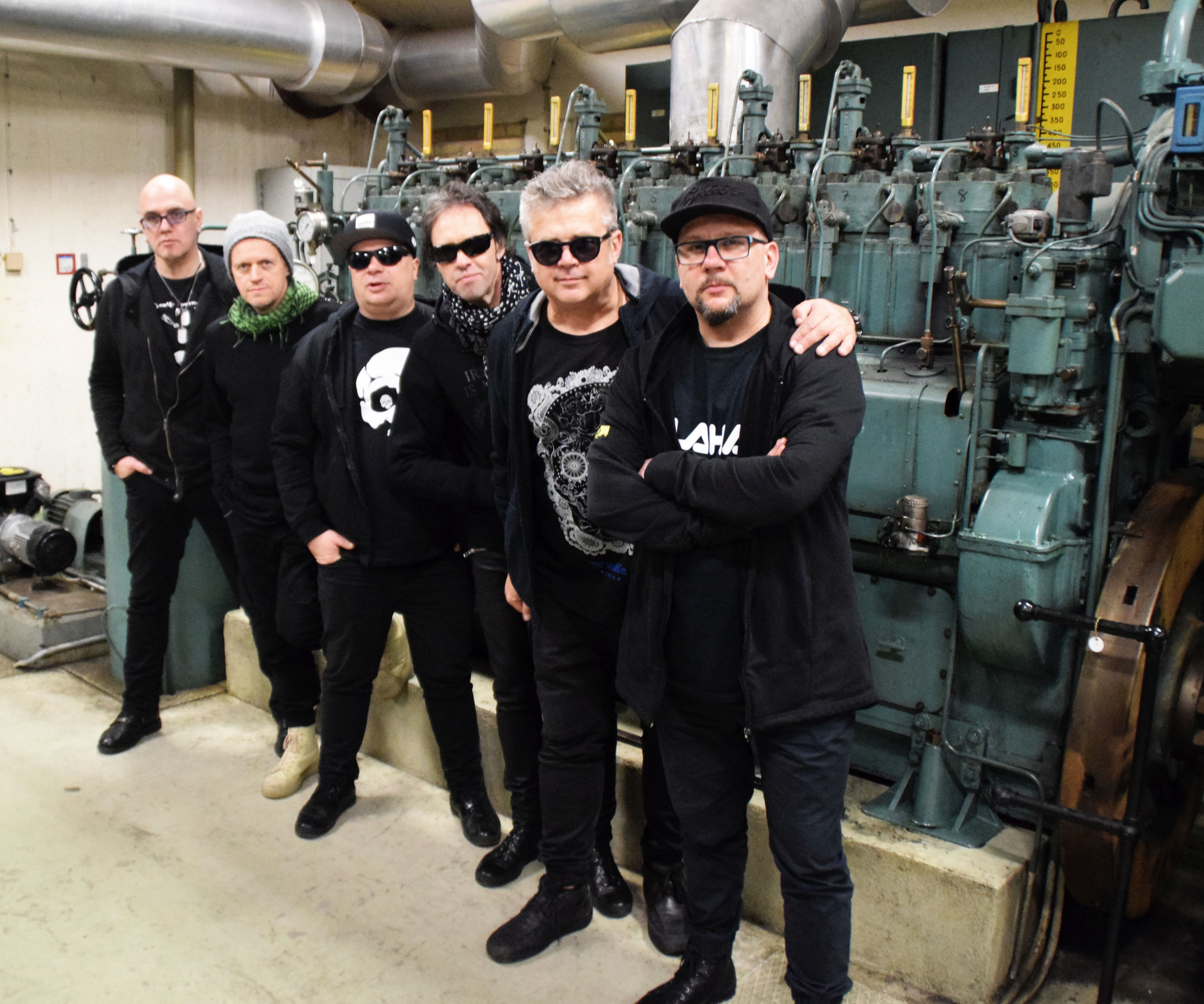
The band in 2018

== Members ==
- Jacek Jędrzejak aka Dżej Dżej (Polish pronunciation for J.J., born August 22, 1963) — Songwriting, bass guitar
- Jarosław Lis aka Dżery (Polish pronunciation for Jerry, born April 18, 1963) — Percussion (drums)
- Roman Lechowicz aka Piękny Roman (Polish for Pretty Roman, born September 27, 1963) — Guitar
- Krzysztof Skiba aka Skiba (born July 7, 1964) — Songwriting, vocals
- Piotr Sztajdel aka Gadak — Keyboards

== Discography ==
=== Studio albums ===
- Z partyjnym pozdrowieniem. 12 hitów w stylu lambada hardcore — (With a Party Greeting; 12 Hits in a Lambada Hardcore Style) 1990
- Nie wierzcie elektrykom — (Don't trust the electricians) 1991
- Miłość, muzyka, mordobicie — (Love, music, brawl) 1992
- Wojna plemników — (War of spermatozoons) 1993
- Nie zapomnisz nigdy — (You'll never forget) 1994
- Golonka, flaki i inne przysmaki — (Pigs Knuckle, tripes, and other delicacies) 1995
- Z gitarą wśród zwierząt — (Among the animals with a guitar) 1996
- Pierwsza komunia, drugie śniadanie, trzecia Rzeczpospolita - (First Communion, second breakfast, third Rzeczpospolita—second breakfast is a Polish idiom for lunch) 1997
- Wszyscy święci — (All saints) 1999
- Świat według Kiepskich - (The world according to Kiepskis) 2000
- Zmień z nami płeć — (Change your sex with us) 2002
- Moherowe Berety - (Mohair Berets) 2006
- Szambo i Perfumeria — (Cesspool & Perfumery) 2008
- Zadzwońcie po milicję — (Call the police) 2011
- Jesteśmy Najlepsi — (We're the best) 2015
- Czarne Słońce Narodu — (The Black Sun of the Nation) 2016
- Przystanek wolność — (Freedom station) 2022
- Wolność słowa na kartonie — (Freedom of speech on cardboard) 2023
- Manifesto — (Manifesto) 2024

=== Compilation albums ===
Title	Album details	Peak chart positions	Sales	Certification
Title	Album details	POL	Sales	Certification
Frankenstein’s Children	Released: March 1994; Label: Red Rossetten Records; Formats: CD; Note: German release compilation album	—		
Bombowe hity czyli the best of 1988-2004	Released: May 17, 2004; Label: Universal Music Poland; Formats: CD, digital download	14	POL: 35,000+	POL: Gold
Na barykadzie rokędrola	Released: December 13, 2009; Label: Stowarzyszenie Strefa Kultury; Formats: CD	—		
Wiecznie żywy	Released: May 14, 2013; Label: Universal Music Poland; Formats: CD, digital download	30		
"—" denotes a recording that did not chart or was not released in that territory.

=== Live albums ===
Title	Album details
Przystanek Woodstock 2013	Released: August 9, 2014; Label: Złoty Melon; Formats: CD+DVD
