= Krzysztof Skiba =

Polish musician

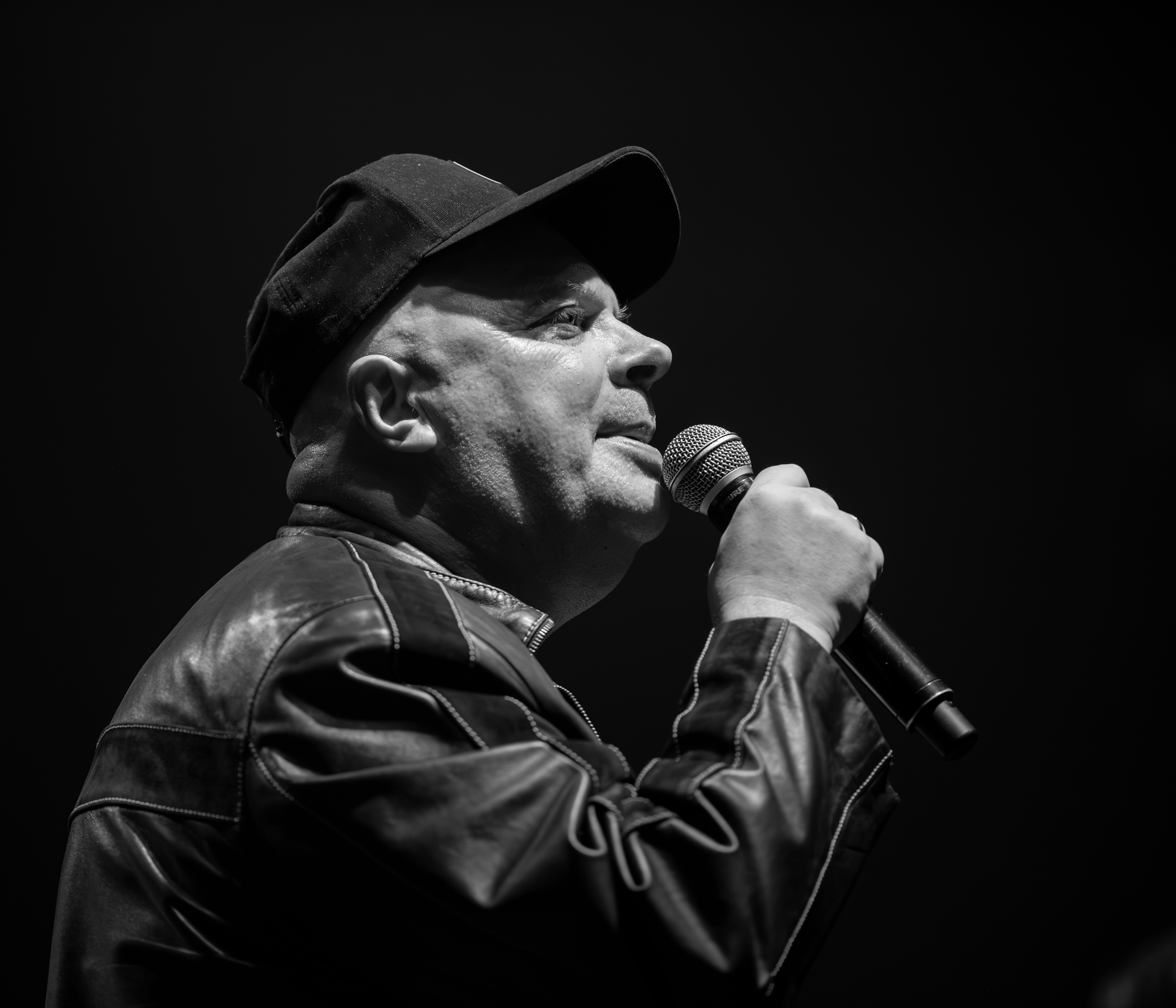
- Krzysztof Skiba, 2025
- Born: 7 July 1964 (age 62); Gdańsk, Poland
- Education: University of Łódź
- Occupations: Singer-songwriter; satirist; essayist; actor
- Musical career
- Also known as: Skiba
- Genres: Comedy rock
- Instrument: Vocals
- Years active: 1988–present
- Label: Universal Music Poland
- Member of: Big Cyc

Krzysztof Skiba (born 7 July 1964 in Gdańsk) is a Polish musician, singer-songwriter, satirist, essayist, and actor. He is best known as the vocalist of the rock band, Big Cyc.

In 1983, he co-founded the anarchy organization Ruch Społeczeństwa Alternatywnego (Movement of Alternative Society), and performed in student theatre Pstrąg and in many school cabarets, also co-creating street happenings named “The Orange Alternative”. In 1988, Skiba joined Jacek Jędrzejak (guitar), Jarosław Lis (drums), and Roman Lechowicz (guitar) in Big Cyc, the previous vocalist, Robert Rejewski, having left. Skiba was the only one who did not choose a pseudonym for his name. For several years, Skiba has written opinion pieces for Wprost, a Polish magazine, and in 2005, published a book: Skibą w mur.

He is known for his controversial behaviour. In May 1999, Skiba was charged with indecent exposure, and fined the equivalent of $308 for mooning Polish prime minister Jerzy Buzek during a festival in February 1999.
