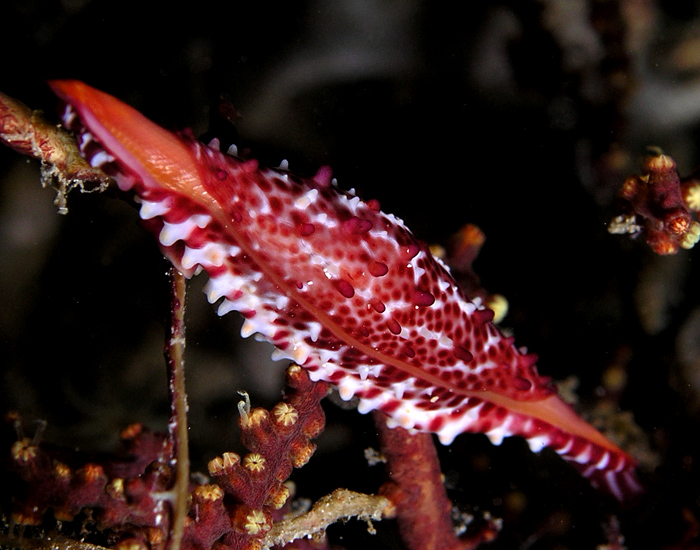
- Phenacovolva nectarea

Scientific classification
- Kingdom: Animalia
- Phylum: Mollusca
- Class: Gastropoda
- Subclass: Caenogastropoda
- Order: Littorinimorpha
- Superfamily: Cypraeoidea
- Family: Ovulidae
- Subfamily: Ovulinae
- Genus: Phenacovolva; Iredale, 1930

Type species
- Phenacovolva nectarea Iredale, 1930

Synonyms
- Phenacovolva (Phenacovolva) Iredale, 1930; Phenacovolva (Turbovula) C. N. Cate, 1973; Turbovula C. N. Cate, 1973; Volva (Phenacovolva) Iredale, 1930

= Phenacovolva =

Genus of gastropods

Phenacovolva is a genus of sea snails, marine gastropod molluscs in the family Ovulidae.

== Description ==
The narrow, tubular shells taper at both ends. The shell grows to a length of 6 cm.

== Distribution ==
These species can usually be found on gorgonians in deep water in the Indo-Pacific.

== Species ==
Species within the genus Phenacovolva include:

- Phenacovolva aurantia (Sowerby III, 1889)
- Phenacovolva barbieri Lorenz & Fehse, 2009
- Phenacovolva brevirostris (Schumacher, 1817)
- Phenacovolva clenchi Cate, 1973
- Phenacovolva dancei Cate, 1973
- Phenacovolva fusula Cate & Azuma in Cate, 1973
- † Phenacovolva gracilisiana Dolin & Lozouet, 2004
- Phenacovolva insculpta (Odhner, 1919)
- Phenacovolva lahainaensis (Cate, 1969)
- Phenacovolva lenoreae Cardin & Walls, 1980
- Phenacovolva morrisoni Lorenz & Fehse, 2009
- Phenacovolva nectarea Iredale, 1930
- Phenacovolva parvita Cate & Azuma in Cate, 1973
- Phenacovolva patriciae Nolf, 2008
- Phenacovolva philippinarum (Sowerby II, 1848)
- Phenacovolva poppei Fehse, 2000
- † Phenacovolva propheta Dolin & Lozouet, 2004
- Phenacovolva pseudogracilis Cate & Azuma in Cate, 1973
- Phenacovolva recurva (Sowerby II in A. Adams & Reeve, 1848)
- Phenacovolva rehderi Cate, 1973
- Phenacovolva rosea (A. Adams, 1854)
- Phenacovolva schmidi Fehse & Wiese, 1993
- Phenacovolva subreflexa (Sowerby II in A. Adams & Reeve, 1848)
- Phenacovolva zuidafrikaana (Cate, 1975)

Species brought into synonymy

- Phenacovolva acuminata (A. Adams & Reeve, 1848): synonym of Simnialena acuminata (Sowerby II in A. Adams & Reeve, 1848)
- Phenacovolva angasi (Reeve, 1865): synonym of Pellasimnia angasi (Reeve, 1865)
- Phenacovolva bartschi Cate, 1973: synonym of Neosimnia bartschi (Cate, 1973): synonym of Simnia bartschi (Cate, 1973)
- Phenacovolva carneopicta Rehder & Wilson, 1975: synonym of Phenacovolva lahainaensis (Cate, 1969)
- Phenacovolva diantha Cate, 1973: synonym of Phenacovolva recurva (Sowerby II in A. Adams & Reeve, 1848)
- Phenacovolva exsul Iredale, 1935: synonym of Pellasimnia angasi (Reeve, 1865)
- Phenacovolva gracilis (Sowerby II in A. Adams & Reeve, 1848): synonym of Phenacovolva subreflexa (Sowerby II in A. Adams & Reeve, 1848)
- Phenacovolva gracillima (E. A. Smith, 1901): synonym of Calcarovula gracillima (E. A. Smith, 1901)
- Phenacovolva greenbergae Cate, 1974: synonym of Quasisimnia hirasei (Pilsbry, 1913)
- Phenacovolva haynesi (Sowerby III, 1889): synonym of Pellasimnia angasi (Reeve, 1865)
- Phenacovolva hirasei (Pilsbry, 1913): synonym of Quasisimnia hirasei (Pilsbry, 1913)
- Phenacovolva honkakujiana (Kuroda, 1928): synonym of Takasagovolva honkakujiana (Kuroda, 1928)
- Phenacovolva improcera (Azuma & Cate, 1971): synonym of Pellasimnia improcera (Azuma & Cate, 1971)
- Phenacovolva kashiwajimensis Cate & Azuma in Cate, 1973: synonym of Phenacovolva rehderi Cate, 1973
- Phenacovolva kiiensis Azuma & Cate, 1971: synonym of Phenacovolva recurva (Sowerby II in A. Adams & Reeve, 1848)
- Phenacovolva labroguttata Schilder, 1969: synonym of Phenacovolva aurantia (Sowerby III, 1889)
- Phenacovolva lindae Petuch, 1987: synonym of Cyphoma intermedium (Sowerby I, 1828)
- Phenacovolva longirostrata (Sowerby I, 1828): synonym of Calcarovula longirostrata (Sowerby I, 1828)
- Phenacovolva piragua (Dall, 1889): synonym of Calcarovula piragua (Dall, 1889)
- Phenacovolva praenominata Iredale, 1935: synonym of Hiatavolva depressa (Sowerby III, 1889)
- Phenacovolva rugosa (Cate & Azuma in Cate, 1973): synonym of Aclyvolva coarctata (G. B. Sowerby II, 1848)
- Phenacovolva tokioi Cate, 1973: synonym of Phenacovolva nectarea Iredale, 1930
- Phenacovolva vitrea Omi & Iino, 2005: synonym of Crenavolva vitrea (Omi & Iino, 2005)
- Phenacovolva wakayamensis Cate & Azuma in Cate, 1973: synonym of Kurodavolva wakayamensis (Cate & Azuma, 1973)
- Phenacovolva weaveri Cate, 1973: synonym of Phenacovolva lahainaensis (Cate, 1969)
- Phenacovolva yoshioi Azuma & Cate, 1971: synonym of Calcarovula gracillima (E. A. Smith, 1901)
