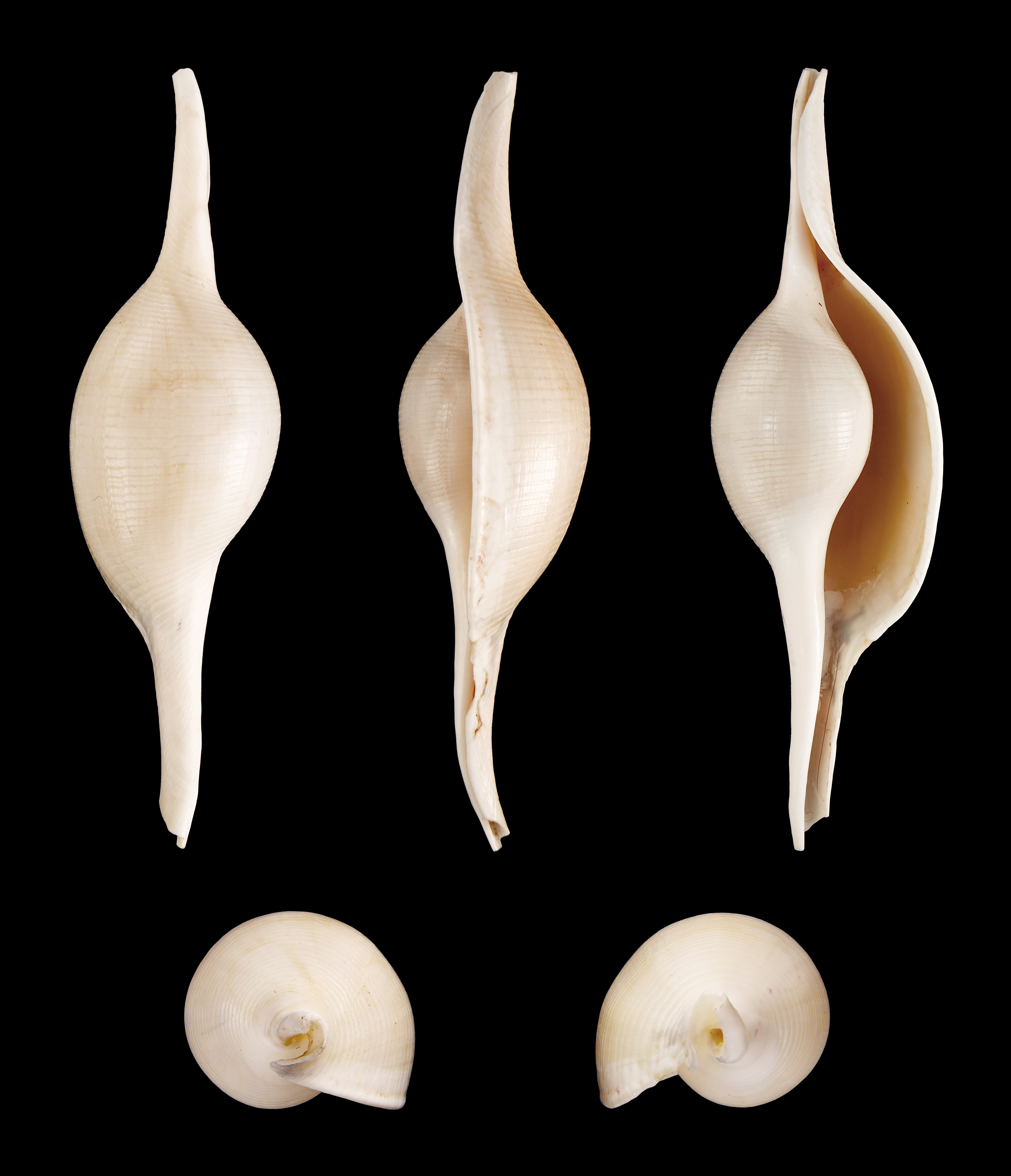
- Five views of a shell of Volva volva

Scientific classification
- Kingdom: Animalia
- Phylum: Mollusca
- Class: Gastropoda
- Subclass: Caenogastropoda
- Order: Littorinimorpha
- Family: Ovulidae
- Subfamily: Ovulinae
- Genus: Volva; Röding, 1798

Species
- See text

Synonyms
- Birostra Swainson, 1840; Birostris Fabricius, 1823; Radius Montfort, 1810

= Volva (gastropod) =

Genus of gastropods

Volva is a genus of sea snails, specifically cowry allies or ovulids, marine gastropod molluscs in the family Ovulidae.

== Species ==
Species within the genus Volva include:

- Volva cumulata Iredale, 1931
- Volva habei Oyama, 1961
- Volva kilburni Cate, 1975
- Volva striata (Lamarck, 1810)
- Volva volva (Linnaeus, 1758)

Synonyms

- Volva acicularis (Lamarck, 1811): synonym of Cymbovula acicularis (Lamarck, 1811)
- Volva adamsi Dunker, 1877: synonym of Phenacovolva rosea (A. Adams, 1854)
- Volva birostris (Linnaeus, 1767): synonym of Phenacovolva birostris (Linnaeus, 1767)
- Volva brevirostris (Schumacher, 1817): synonym of Phenacovolva brevirostris (Schumacher, 1817)
- Volva brunneiterma Cate, 1969: synonym of Pellasimnia brunneiterma (Cate, 1969)
- Volva carpenteri Dunker, 1877: synonym of Phenacovolva rosea (A. Adams, 1854)
- Volva haynesi (Sowerby III, 1889): synonym of Pellasimnia angasi (Reeve, 1865)
- Volva lemurica Schilder, 1941: synonym of Volva volva (Linnaeus, 1758)
- Volva longirostrata (Sowerby II, 1828): synonym for Phenacovolva recurva (Sowerby II in A. Adams & Reeve, 1848)
- Volva rosea A. Adams, 1854: synonym of Phenacovolva rosea (A. Adams, 1854)
- Volva sowerbyana Allan, 1956: synonym of Phenacovolva rosea (A. Adams, 1854)
