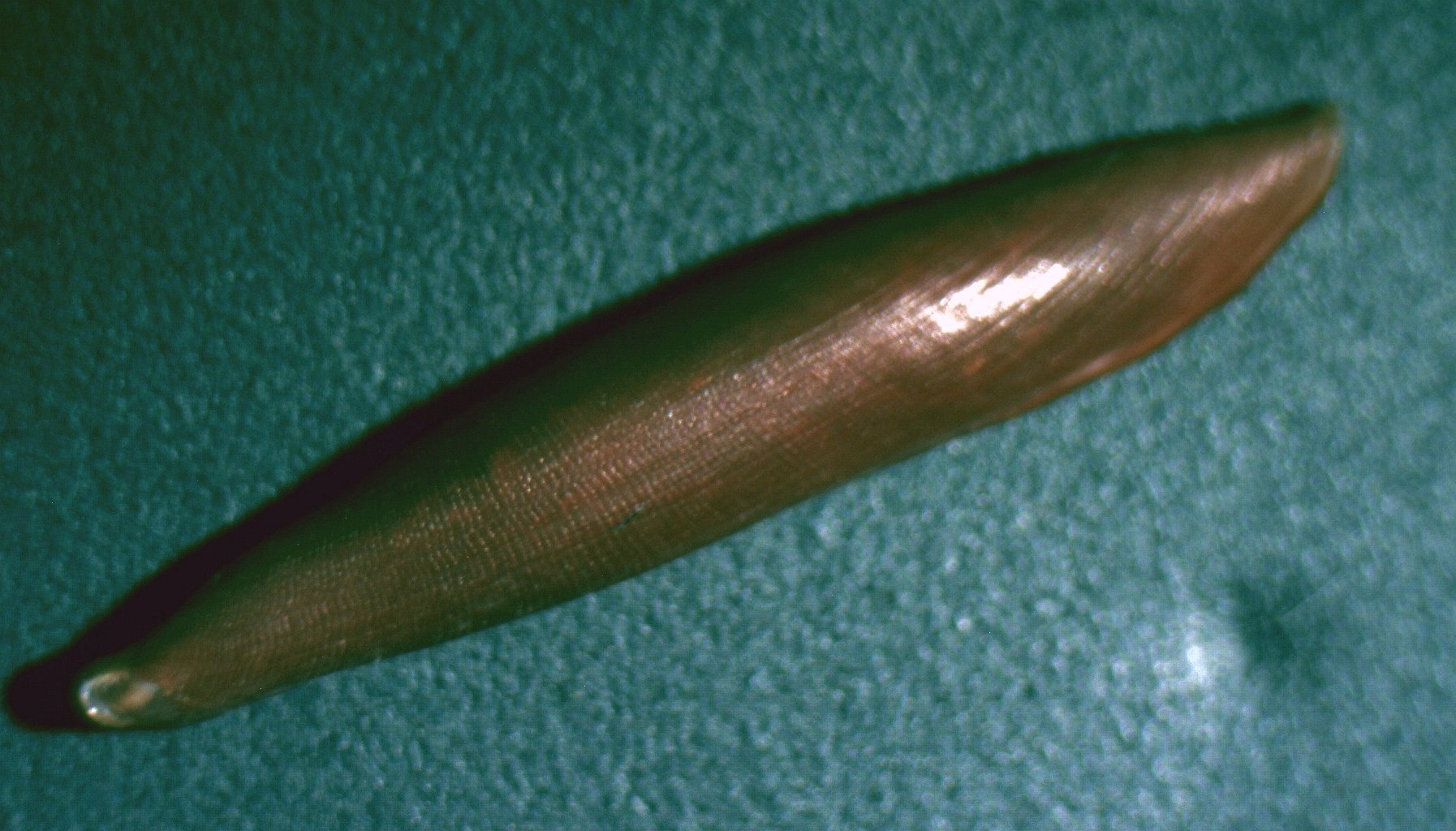
- Abapertural view of Aclyvolva lanceolata

Scientific classification
- Kingdom: Animalia
- Phylum: Mollusca
- Class: Gastropoda
- Subclass: Caenogastropoda
- Order: Littorinimorpha
- Family: Ovulidae
- Genus: Aclyvolva; Cate, 1973

Type species
- Ovulum lanceolatum G. B. Sowerby II, 1849

= Aclyvolva =

Genus of gastropods

Aclyvolva is a genus of sea snails, marine gastropod mollusks in the subfamily Aclyvolvinae of the family Ovulidae.

== Species ==
Species within the genus Aclyvolva include:

- Aclyvolva coarctata (G. B. Sowerby II, 1848)
- Aclyvolva granularis Ma, 1986
- Aclyvolva lanceolata (G.B. Sowerby II, 1848)
- Aclyvolva rubracarinata Fehse, 2018

Species brought into synonymy

- Aclyvolva clara Cate, 1973: synonym of Calcarovula gracillima (E. A. Smith, 1901)
- Aclyvolva haynesi (G.B. Sowerby III, 1889): synonym of Pellasimnia angasi (Reeve, 1865)
- Aclyvolva lamyi (Schilder, 1932): synonym of Pellasimnia angasi (Reeve, 1865)
- Aclyvolva nicolamassierae Fehse, 1999: synonym of Aclyvolva lanceolata (G. B. Sowerby II, 1849)
- Aclyvolva vulgaris Ma, 1986: synonym of Hiatavolva coarctata (Sowerby II in A. Adams & Reeve, 1848)

Nomen dubium

- Aclyvolva framea Cate, 1973 (nomen dubium)
