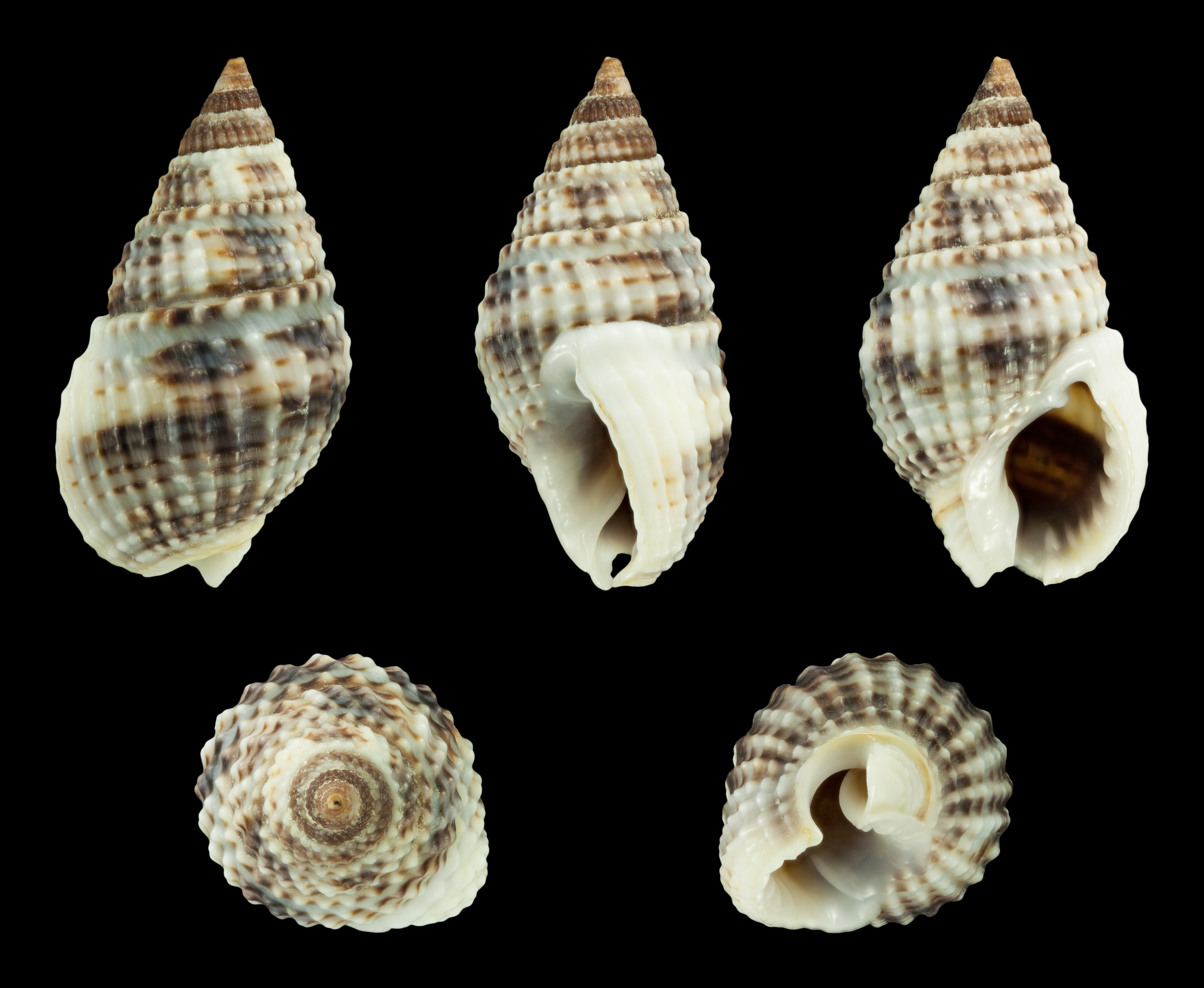
- Shell of Nassarius margaritifer

Scientific classification
- Kingdom: Animalia
- Phylum: Mollusca
- Class: Gastropoda
- Subclass: Caenogastropoda
- Order: Neogastropoda
- Family: Nassariidae
- Genus: Nassarius
- Species: N. margaritifer

Binomial name
- Nassarius margaritifer (Dunker, 1847)

Synonyms
- Buccinum margaritiferum Dunker, 1847; Buccinum reticulatum Quoy & Gaimard, 1833; Nassa (Niotha) margaritifera (Dunker, 1847); Nassa (Tritia) costellifera A. Adams, 1853; Nassa costellifera A. Adams, 1853; Nassa margaritifer (Dunker, 1847); Nassa margaritifera (Dunker, 1847); Nassa quoyii Rousseau, 1854; Nassarius (Zeuxis) margaritifer (Dunker, 1847); Nassarius (Zeuxis) margaritiferus (Dunker, 1847); Nassarius costellifera (A. Adams, 1853); Nassarius crenelliferus (A. Adams, 1853); Nassarius margaritifera (Dunker, 1847); Nassarius margaritifera var. costellifera A. Adams, 1853; Nassarius margaritiferus (Dunker, 1847); Niotha margaritifera (Dunker, 1847); Zeuxis margaritiferus (Dunker, 1847)

= Nassarius margaritifer =

Species of gastropod

Nassarius margaritifer is a species of sea snail, a marine gastropod mollusk in the family Nassariidae, the Nassa mud snails or dog whelks.

== Description ==
The shell size varies between 20 mm and 35 mm

== Distribution ==
This species occurs in the Indian Ocean off Kenya, Tanzania and the Aldabra Atoll, in the Pacific Ocean off the Philippines
