= Calliostoma venustum =

- Drawing of a shell of Calliostoma venustum

Scientific classification
- Kingdom: Animalia
- Phylum: Mollusca
- Class: Gastropoda
- Subclass: Vetigastropoda
- Order: Trochida
- Family: Calliostomatidae
- Subfamily: Calliostomatinae
- Genus: Calliostoma
- Species: C. venustum

Binomial name
- Calliostoma venustum (Dunker, 1871)

Synonyms
- Ziziphinus venustus Dunker, 1871

Species of gastropod

Calliostoma venustum is a species of sea snail, a marine gastropod mollusk in the family Calliostomatidae.

== Description ==
The height of the shell attains 13 mm. The imperforate shell has an elevated-conical form, narrow and slender, the lateral outlines of spire straight, the base convex. It is strong and solid. The ground color is either olive-green or dark red, with narrow longitudinal stripes of white. The periphery of the body whorl is sometimes articulated with white, and the base of the shell is either unicolored dark, or finely dotted with white. The shell contains 10 whorls, the apical one or two convex and smooth, the following flat, finely spirally striate (about 14 striae on the penultimate whorl of a large specimen). The body whorl is convex at the periphery, angulated there in specimens not completely adult, and convex beneath, with 10-12 concentric lirulae there. The entire surface contains fine lines of growth. There is sometimes a slight tendency toward plication on the periphery of the last whorl. The oblique aperture is quadrangular and smooth inside. The basal lip is thickened by a straight callous inside. The short columella is vertical, arcuate above, and terminaties in a truncation or fold-like tooth. The columella is very strongly folded at the base.

== Distribution ==
This species occurs in the Pacific Ocean off the Fiji Islands.
