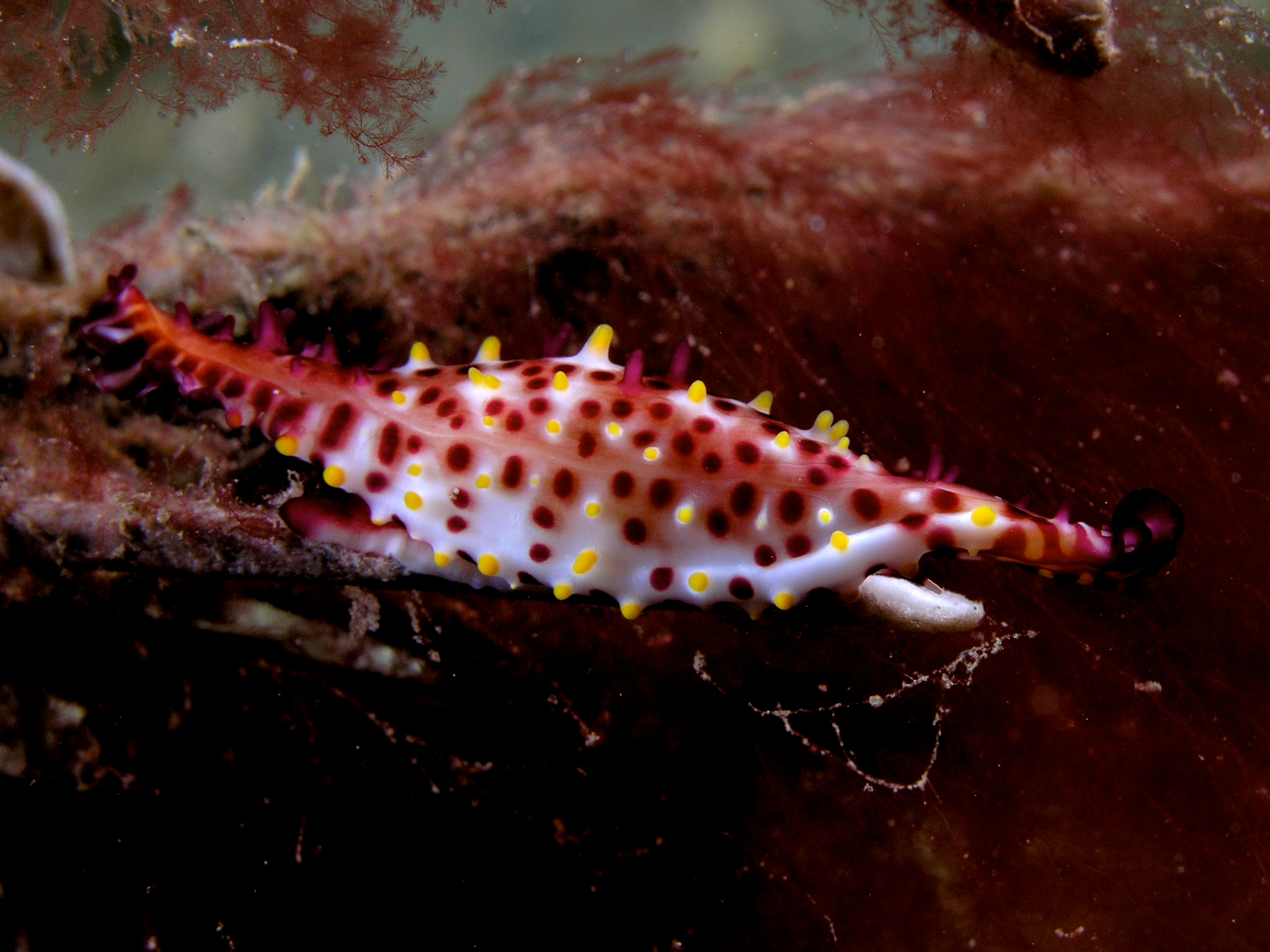

Scientific classification
- Kingdom: Animalia
- Phylum: Mollusca
- Class: Gastropoda
- Subclass: Caenogastropoda
- Order: Littorinimorpha
- Superfamily: Cypraeoidea
- Family: Ovulidae
- Subfamily: Ovulinae
- Genus: Phenacovolva
- Species: P. rosea

Binomial name
- Phenacovolva rosea (A. Adams, 1854)

Synonyms
- Neosimnia lanceolata Allan, 1956; Ovula adamsii Dunker, 1885; Volva adamsi Dunker, 1877; Volva carpenteri Dunker, 1877; Volva rosea A. Adams, 1854; Volva sowerbyana Allan, 1956

= Phenacovolva rosea =

Rosy spindle cowry

Species of gastropod

Phenacovolva rosea, also known as the rosy spindle cowry, is a species of sea snail, a marine gastropod mollusc in the family Ovulidae, the ovulids, cowry allies or false cowries. It lives and feeds on fan, whip and bush-type gorgonians.

== Description ==
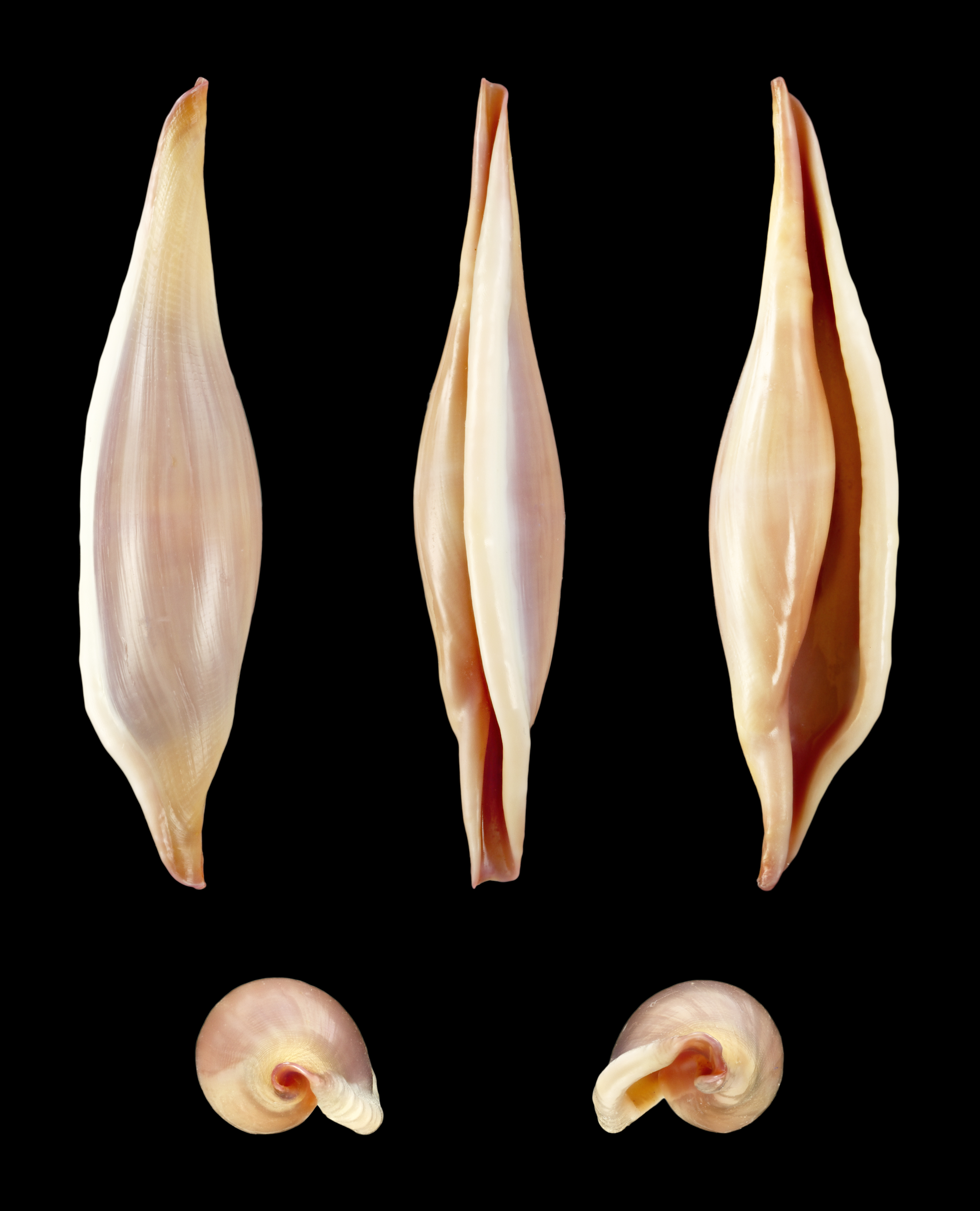
Shell

The rosy spindle cowry is an elongated species with an aperture along the entire length of the shell. The shape is fusiform (cigar-shaped), with slender tapering ends and a slightly broader central section. Adult shells measure between 23 and 57 mm (0.9 and 2.2 in) in length and the spire is almost invisible. There are crenelations on the lip of the aperture at the dorsal end, but these decrease in size towards the centre of the shell. The shell is some shade of pale pink, orange or brown, usually with a paler band in the centre. In life, the mantle almost completely covers the shell; it is translucent and a shimmering reddish-orange, or occasionally yellow, sometimes with darker specks or white streaks, and covered with orange, red or tan, plume-like protuberances. This species is very similar in appearance to Phenacovolva nectarea, but that species can usually be distinguished by the presence of a rather indistinct dark band near the centre of the shell in addition to the pale band present in both species.

== Distribution ==
This mollusc has a wide distribution in the Indo-Pacific region and is a relatively common species. Its range extends from the east coast of Africa to Indonesia, southern Japan, New Caledonia and tropical Australia. Its depth range is down to about 250 m (820 ft).

== Ecology ==
The rosy spindle cowry is always associated with gorgonians; it utilises a range of species on which to live, including fan, whip and bush types. It is anchored to its host by a long, narrow foot. It is a carnivore and feeds on the polyps and soft tissues of the gorgonians on which it lives. It could be considered to be an ectoparasite.

The sexes are separate in this mollusc. The female deposits a cluster of several dozen egg capsules on the host, each capsule containing hundreds of eggs. The larvae are planktonic and need to settle on a suitable gorgonian host in order to continue their development.
