= Vexillum kraussi =

Scientific classification
- Kingdom: Animalia
- Phylum: Mollusca
- Class: Gastropoda
- Subclass: Caenogastropoda
- Order: Neogastropoda
- Family: Costellariidae
- Genus: Vexillum
- Species: V. kraussi

Binomial name
- Vexillum kraussi (Dunker, 1861)

Synonyms
- Mitra kraussi Dunker, 1861 (original combination); Vexillum (Pusia) kraussi (Dunker, 1861) ·

Species of gastropod

Vexillum kraussi is a species of small sea snail, marine gastropod mollusk in the family Costellariidae, the ribbed miters.

== Description ==
The length of the shell attains 14 mm, its diameter is 6 mm.

== Distribution ==
This marine species occurs off Japan.
