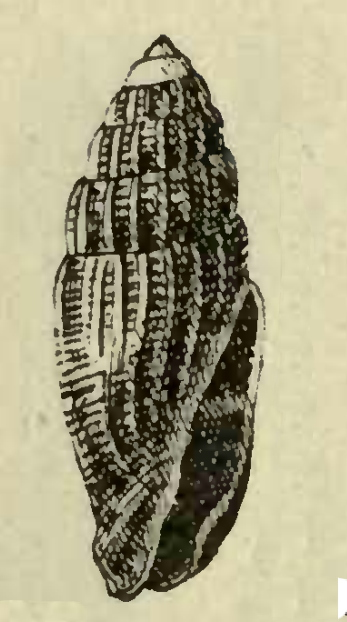
- Drawing of a shell of Vexillum nicobaricum

Scientific classification
- Kingdom: Animalia
- Phylum: Mollusca
- Class: Gastropoda
- Subclass: Caenogastropoda
- Order: Neogastropoda
- Superfamily: Turbinelloidea
- Family: Costellariidae
- Genus: Vexillum
- Species: V. nicobaricum

Binomial name
- Vexillum nicobaricum (Dunker, 1866)

Synonyms
- Mitra nicobarica Dunker, 1866 (original combination); Vexillum (Costellaria) nicobaricum (Dunker, 1866)

= Vexillum nicobaricum =

Species of gastropod

Vexillum nicobaricum is a species of small sea snail, marine gastropod mollusk in the family Costellariidae, the ribbed miters.

== Description ==
The length of the shell attains 16 mm.

(Original description) The small, thick ovate-oblong shell has a subfusiform shape. It shows narrow longitudinal ribs with transversal ridges. The shell is chocolate brown, surrounded by a pellucid line in the upper part of the body whorl. The spire is short. The aperture is dark brown. The columella is triplicate. The inner lip is striated.

This small, fairly thick-skinned, monochrome black-brown miter is characterized by a relatively short spire, because the body whorl is almost two thirds of the whole length of the shell. The whorls are set off in a somewhat stepped manner, In the first third of the body whorl one notices a bluish-white narrow band.

== Distribution ==
This marine species occurs off the Nicobar Islands and Papua New Guinea.
