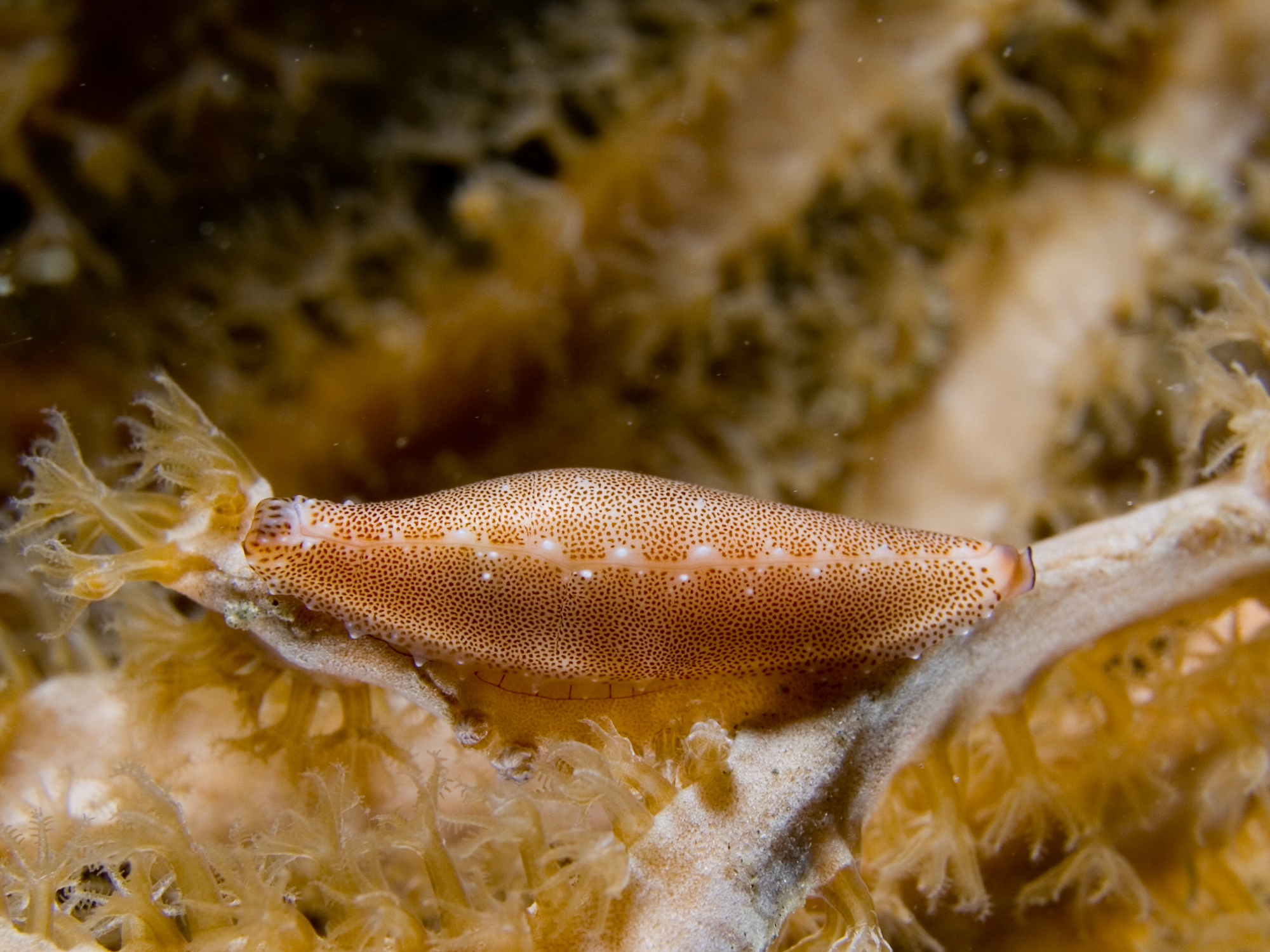
- A live individual of Pellasimnia brunneiterma on a soft coral

Scientific classification
- Kingdom: Animalia
- Phylum: Mollusca
- Class: Gastropoda
- Subclass: Caenogastropoda
- Order: Littorinimorpha
- Superfamily: Cypraeoidea
- Family: Ovulidae
- Subfamily: Ovulinae
- Genus: Pellasimnia; Schilder, 1939

Type species
- Ovulum angasi Reeve, 1865

Synonyms
- Phenacovolva (Pellasimnia) Schilder, 1939

= Pellasimnia =

Genus of gastropods

Pellasimnia is a genus of predatory sea snails, marine gastropod mollusk in the subfamily Ovulinae of the family Ovulidae, sometimes known as the false cowries and the cowry allies.

== Species ==
According to the World Register of Marine Species (WoRMS) the following species with accepted names are included within the genus Pellasimnia :

- Pellasimnia angasi (Reeve, 1865) - the type species of the genus
- Pellasimnia annabelae Lorenz & Fehse, 2009
- Pellasimnia brunneiterma (Cate, 1969)
- Pellasimnia cleaveri Lorenz & Fehse, 2009
- Pellasimnia hochmuthi Lorenz & Fehse, 2009
- Pellasimnia improcera (Azuma & Cate, 1971)
- † Pellasimnia maxwelli Beu & B. A. Marshall, 2011
- Pellasimnia mcoyi (Tenison-Woods, 1878)

Species brought into synonymy

- Pellasimnia aurantia Carlsson, 1969: synonym of Phenacovolva aurantia (Sowerby III, 1889)
- Pellasimnia exsul Iredale, 1935: synonym of Pellasimnia maccoyi (Tenison-Woods, 1878)
- Pellasimnia verconis Cotton & Godfrey, 1932: synonym of Cuspivolva helenae (Cate, 1973)
