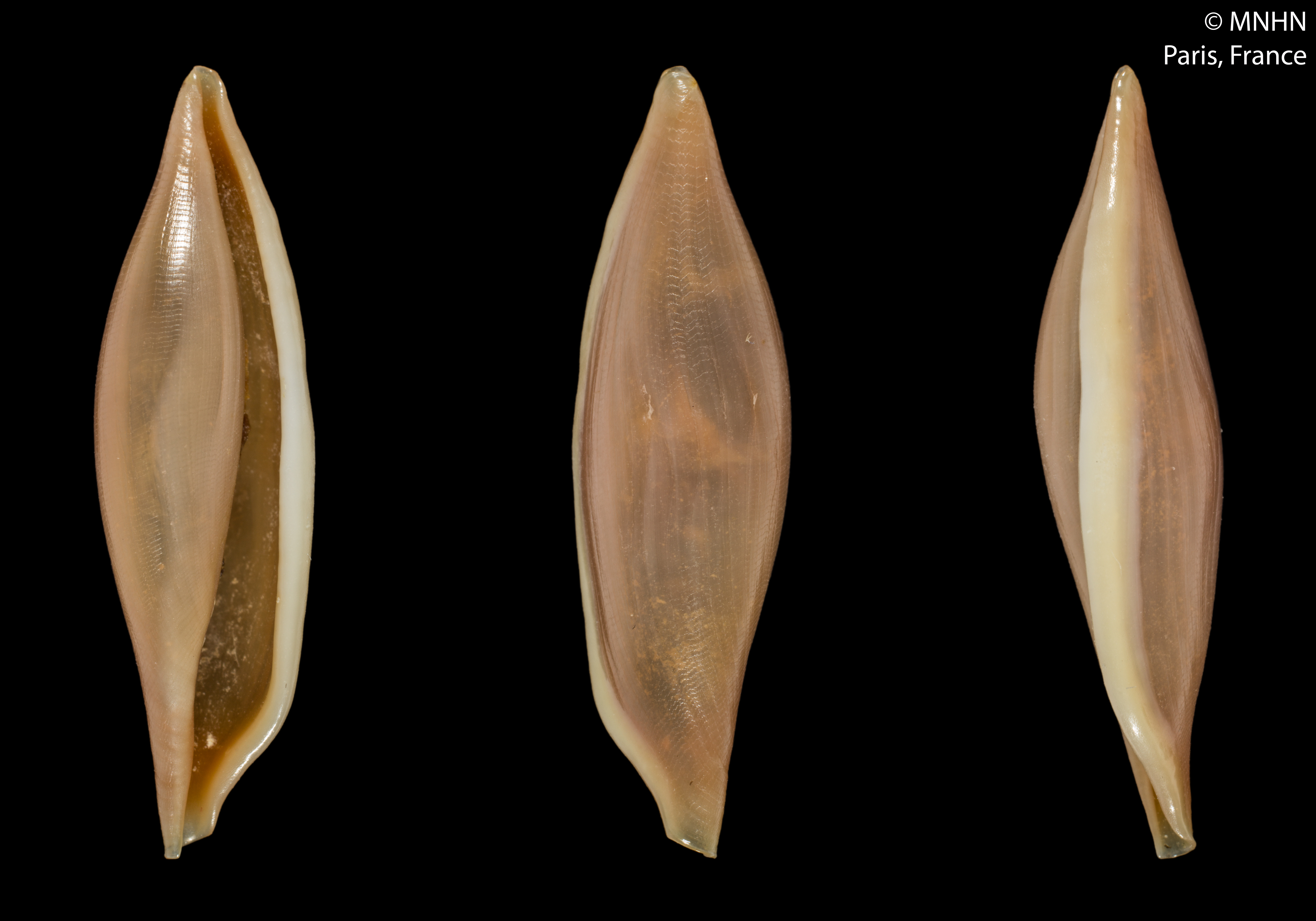
- Shell of Phenacovolva morrisoni (holotype at MNHN, Paris)

Scientific classification
- Kingdom: Animalia
- Phylum: Mollusca
- Class: Gastropoda
- Subclass: Caenogastropoda
- Order: Littorinimorpha
- Family: Ovulidae
- Genus: Phenacovolva
- Species: P. morrisoni

Binomial name
- Phenacovolva morrisoni Lorenz & Fehse, 2009

= Phenacovolva morrisoni =

Species of gastropod

Phenacovolva morrisoni is a species of sea snail, a marine gastropod mollusc in the family Ovulidae, the ovulids, cowry allies or false cowries.

== Description ==
The length of the shell attains 19.7 mm.

== Distribution ==
This marine species occurs in the South China Sea off the Spratly Islands.
