= Phenacovolva lenoreae =

Scientific classification
- Kingdom: Animalia
- Phylum: Mollusca
- Class: Gastropoda
- Subclass: Caenogastropoda
- Order: Littorinimorpha
- Family: Ovulidae
- Genus: Phenacovolva
- Species: P. lenoreae

Binomial name
- Phenacovolva lenoreae Cardin & Walls, 1980

Synonyms
- Neosimnia bellamaris Berry, 1946

Species of gastropod

Phenacovolva lenoreae is a species of sea snail, a marine gastropod mollusc in the family Ovulidae, the ovulids, cowry allies or false cowries. They are found in the oceans surrounding Panama and Ecuador.
