= Volva cumulata =

Scientific classification
- Kingdom: Animalia
- Phylum: Mollusca
- Class: Gastropoda
- Subclass: Caenogastropoda
- Order: Littorinimorpha
- Family: Ovulidae
- Genus: Volva
- Species: V. cumulata

Binomial name
- Volva cumulata Iredale, 1931

Synonyms
- Volva volva cumulata Iredale, 1931

Species of gastropod

Volva cumulata is a species of sea snail, a marine gastropod mollusk in the family Ovulidae, the ovulids, cowry allies or false cowries.
