= Pellasimnia cleaveri =

Scientific classification
- Kingdom: Animalia
- Phylum: Mollusca
- Class: Gastropoda
- Subclass: Caenogastropoda
- Order: Littorinimorpha
- Family: Ovulidae
- Genus: Pellasimnia
- Species: P. cleaveri

Binomial name
- Pellasimnia cleaveri Lorenz & Fehse, 2009

Species of gastropod

Pellasimnia cleaveri is a species of sea snail, a marine gastropod mollusk in the family Ovulidae, the ovulids, cowry allies or false cowries.
