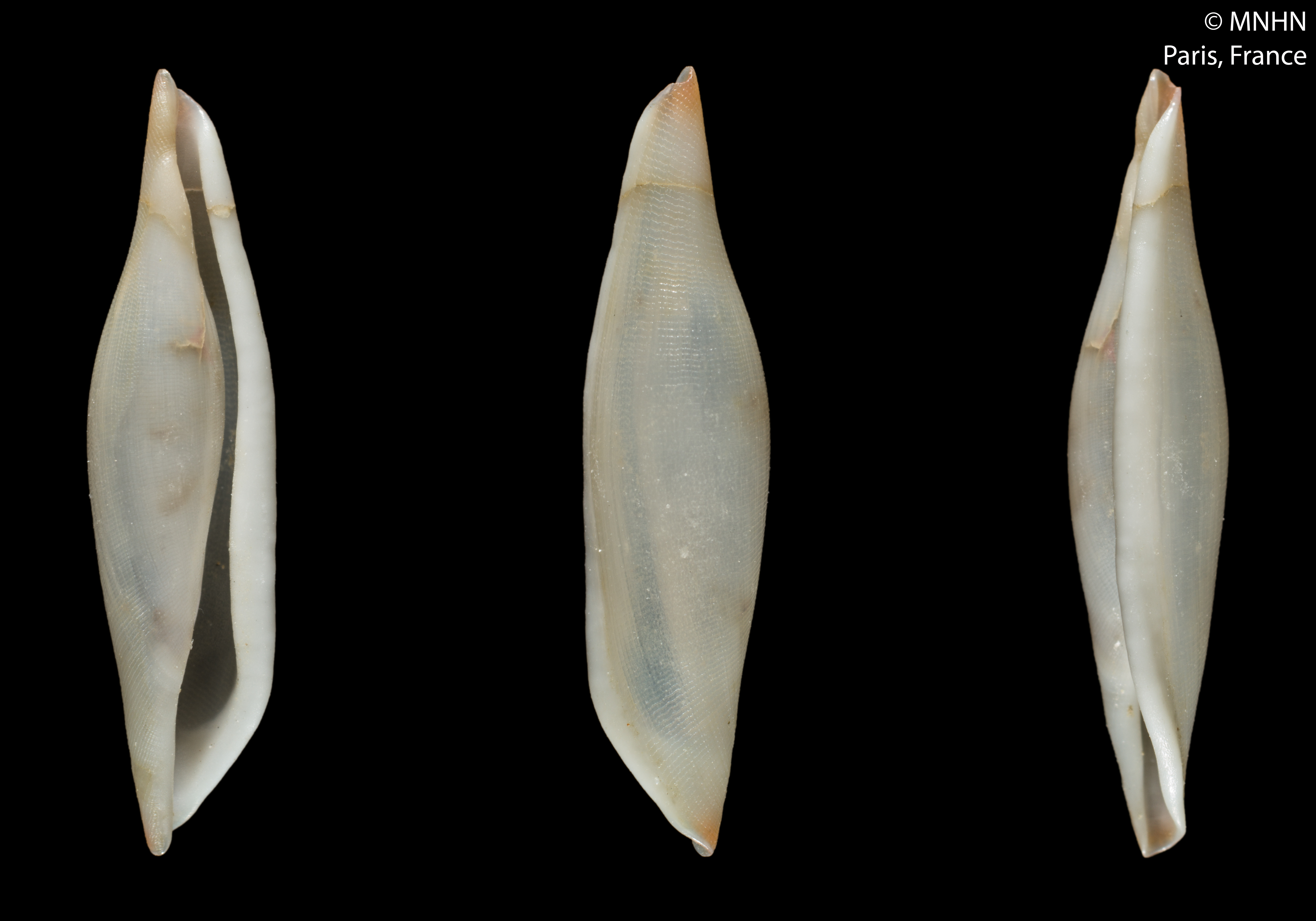
- Shell of Pellasimnia hochmuthi (holotype at MNHN, Paris)

Scientific classification
- Kingdom: Animalia
- Phylum: Mollusca
- Class: Gastropoda
- Subclass: Caenogastropoda
- Order: Littorinimorpha
- Family: Ovulidae
- Genus: Pellasimnia
- Species: P. hochmuthi

Binomial name
- Pellasimnia hochmuthi Lorenz & Fehse, 2009

= Pellasimnia hochmuthi =

Species of gastropod

Pellasimnia hochmuthi is a species of sea snail, a marine gastropod mollusk in the family Ovulidae, the ovulids, cowry allies or false cowries.

== Description ==
The length of the shell attains 12.9 mm.

== Distribution ==
This species occurs in the East China Sea.
