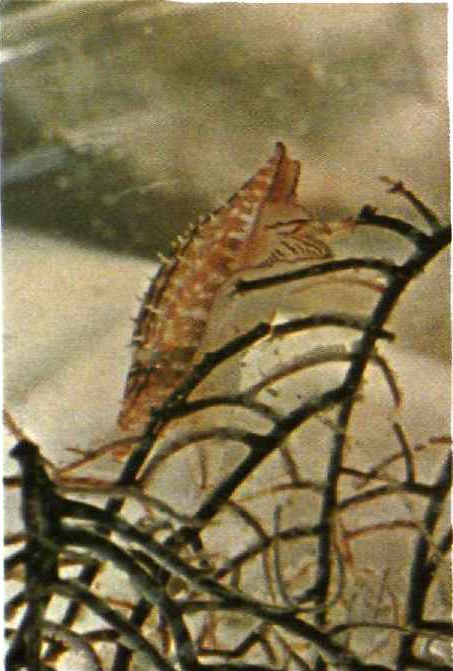
- Photo of living animal of Phenacovolva lahainensis on Antipathes sp.

Scientific classification
- Kingdom: Animalia
- Phylum: Mollusca
- Class: Gastropoda
- Subclass: Caenogastropoda
- Order: Littorinimorpha
- Family: Ovulidae
- Genus: Phenacovolva
- Species: P. lahainaensis

Binomial name
- Phenacovolva lahainaensis (Cate, 1969)

Synonyms
- Phenacovolva carneopicta Rehder & Wilson, 1975; Phenacovolva weaveri Cate, 1973; Spiculata michaelkingi Cate, 1973

= Phenacovolva lahainaensis =

Species of mollusc

Phenacovolva lahainaensis is a species of sea snail, a marine gastropod mollusc in the family Ovulidae, the ovulids, cowry allies or false cowries. It was originally discovered alive on black coral on the coast of the island of Maui.
