= Phenacovolva insculpta =

Scientific classification
- Kingdom: Animalia
- Phylum: Mollusca
- Class: Gastropoda
- Subclass: Caenogastropoda
- Order: Littorinimorpha
- Family: Ovulidae
- Genus: Phenacovolva
- Species: P. insculpta

Binomial name
- Phenacovolva insculpta (Odhner, 1919)

Synonyms
- Ovula insculpta Odhner, 1919

Species of gastropod

Phenacovolva insculpta is a species of sea snail, a marine gastropod mollusc in the family Ovulidae, the ovulids, cowry allies or false cowries.
