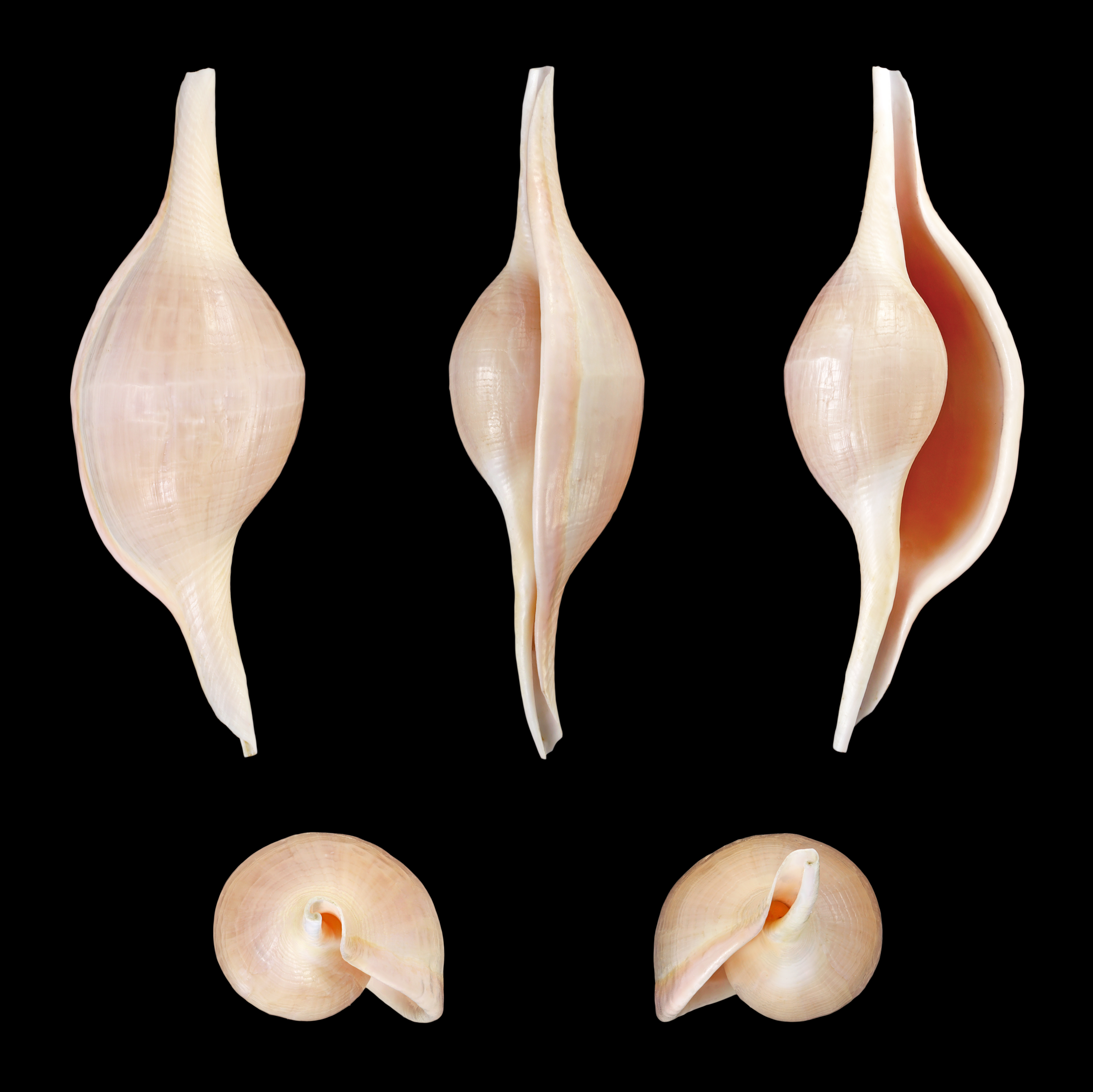

Scientific classification
- Kingdom: Animalia
- Phylum: Mollusca
- Class: Gastropoda
- Subclass: Caenogastropoda
- Order: Littorinimorpha
- Family: Ovulidae
- Genus: Volva
- Species: V. habei

Binomial name
- Volva habei Oyama, 1961

Synonyms
- Ovulum volva Sowerby I, 1830; Volva volva habei Oyama, 1961

= Volva habei =

Species of gastropod

Volva habei is a species of sea snail, a marine gastropod mollusk in the family Ovulidae, the ovulids, cowry allies or false cowries.

== Description ==
The size of the shell varies between 48 mm and 110 mm.

== Distribution ==
This marine species occurs off Taiwan and Japan.
