= Calcarovula ildiko =

Scientific classification
- Kingdom: Animalia
- Phylum: Mollusca
- Class: Gastropoda
- Subclass: Caenogastropoda
- Order: Littorinimorpha
- Family: Ovulidae
- Genus: Calcarovula
- Species: C. ildiko

Binomial name
- Calcarovula ildiko Lorenz, 2006

Species of gastropod

Calcarovula ildiko is a species of sea snail, a marine gastropod mollusk in the family Ovulidae, the ovulids, cowry allies or false cowries.
