= Pellasimnia mcoyi =

Scientific classification
- Kingdom: Animalia
- Phylum: Mollusca
- Class: Gastropoda
- Subclass: Caenogastropoda
- Order: Littorinimorpha
- Family: Ovulidae
- Genus: Pellasimnia
- Species: P. mcoyi

Binomial name
- Pellasimnia mcoyi (Tenison-Woods, 1878)

Synonyms
- Birostra mccoyi Tenison-Woods, 1878; Dissona maccoyi (Tenison-Woods, 1878); Pellasimnia exsul Iredale, 1935

Species of gastropod

Pellasimnia mcoyi is a species of sea snail, a marine gastropod mollusk in the family Ovulidae, the ovulids, cowry allies or false cowries.
