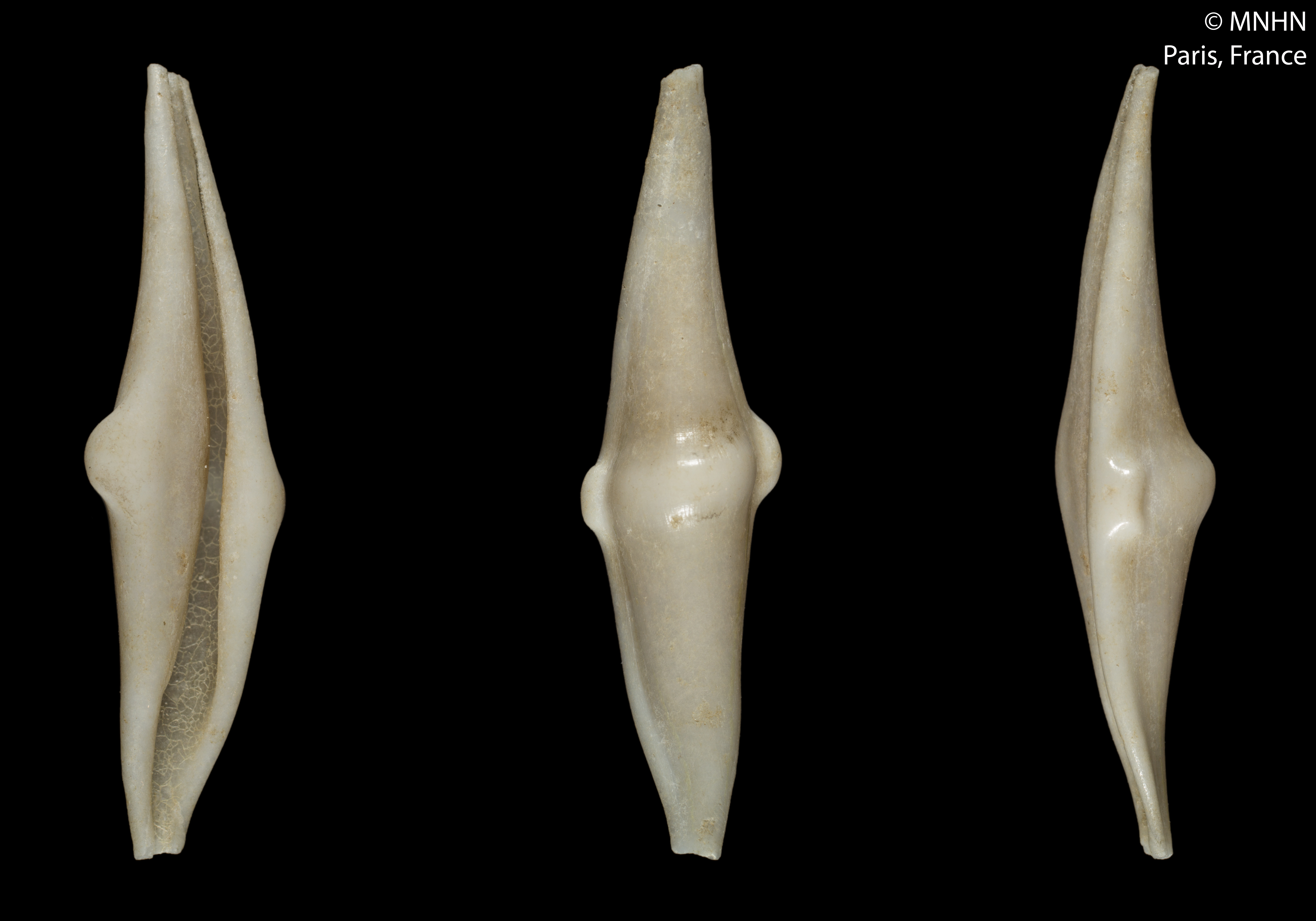
- Shell of Calcarovula arthritica (holotype at MNHN, Paris)

Scientific classification
- Kingdom: Animalia
- Phylum: Mollusca
- Class: Gastropoda
- Subclass: Caenogastropoda
- Order: Littorinimorpha
- Family: Ovulidae
- Genus: Calcarovula
- Species: C. arthritica

Binomial name
- Calcarovula arthritica Lorenz & Fehse, 2009

= Calcarovula arthritica =

Species of gastropod

Calcarovula arthritica is a species of sea snail, a marine gastropod mollusk in the family Ovulidae, the ovulids, cowry allies or false cowries.

== Distribution ==
This marine species occurs off Fiji.
