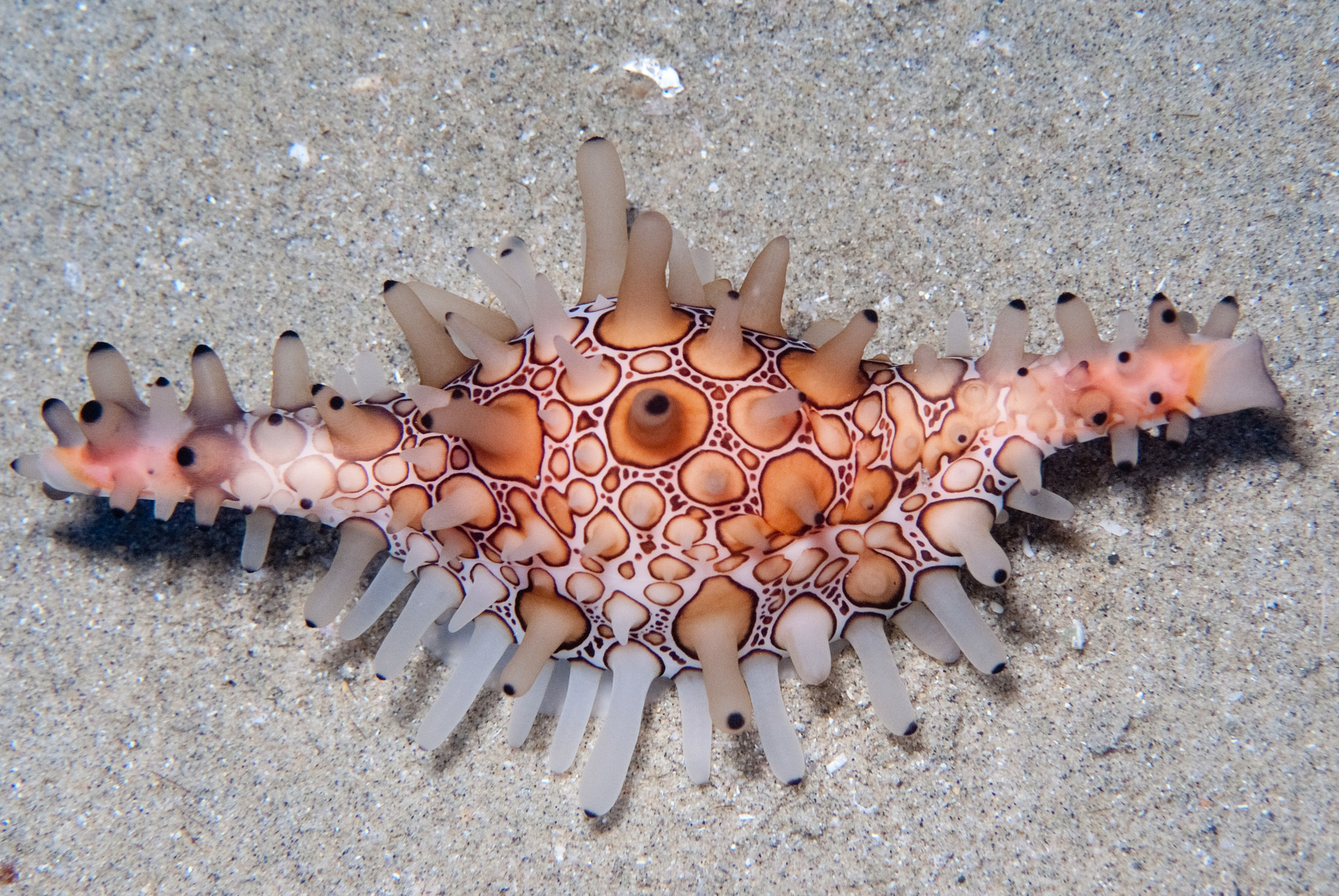
- Volva volva near Ponta do Ouro, Mozambique
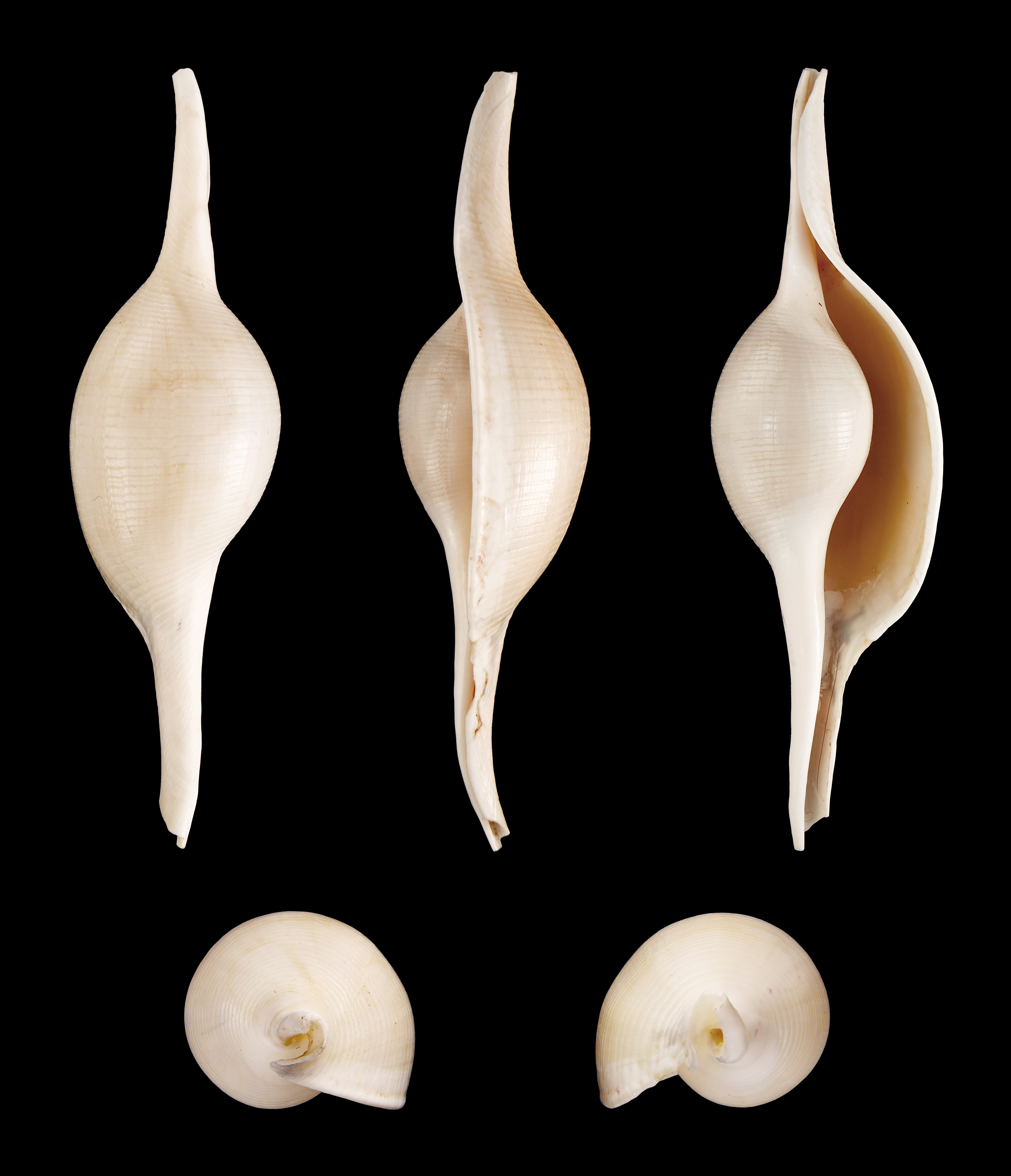
- Five views of a shell of Volva volva

Scientific classification
- Kingdom: Animalia
- Phylum: Mollusca
- Class: Gastropoda
- Subclass: Caenogastropoda
- Order: Littorinimorpha
- Family: Ovulidae
- Genus: Volva
- Species: V. volva

Binomial name
- Volva volva (Linnaeus, 1758)

Synonyms
- Bulla volva Linnaeus, 1758; Ovula aspera Perry, 1811; Ovula textoria Röding, 1798; Volva lemurica Schilder, 1941; Volva volva volva (Linnaeus, 1758)

= Volva volva =

Species of gastropod

Volva volva is a species of sea snail, a marine gastropod mollusk in the family Ovulidae (false cowries). In Australia the shells are commonly referred to as a shuttle or spindle egg cowry.

== Description ==
The shell of Volva volva ranges between 45 and 186 mm (1.8 and 7.3 in) in length. The canals are long and narrow, while the body whorl is about one-third or less of the shell length. These canals can be straight or curved and the colour of the shell varies from a pale cream to light pink.

== Distribution ==
Volva volva is found in the Pacific and Indian Oceans.
