= Volva kilburni =

Scientific classification
- Kingdom: Animalia
- Phylum: Mollusca
- Class: Gastropoda
- Subclass: Caenogastropoda
- Order: Littorinimorpha
- Family: Ovulidae
- Genus: Volva
- Species: V. kilburni

Binomial name
- Volva kilburni Cate, 1975

Species of gastropod

Volva kilburni is a species of sea snail, a marine gastropod mollusk in the family Ovulidae.
