= Phenacovolva rehderi =

Scientific classification
- Kingdom: Animalia
- Phylum: Mollusca
- Class: Gastropoda
- Subclass: Caenogastropoda
- Order: Littorinimorpha
- Family: Ovulidae
- Genus: Phenacovolva
- Species: P. rehderi

Binomial name
- Phenacovolva rehderi Cate, 1973

Synonyms
- Phenacovolva kashiwajimensis Cate & Azuma in Cate, 1973

Species of gastropod

Phenacovolva rehderi is a species of sea snail, a marine gastropod mollusc in the family Ovulidae, the ovulids, cowry allies or false cowries.
