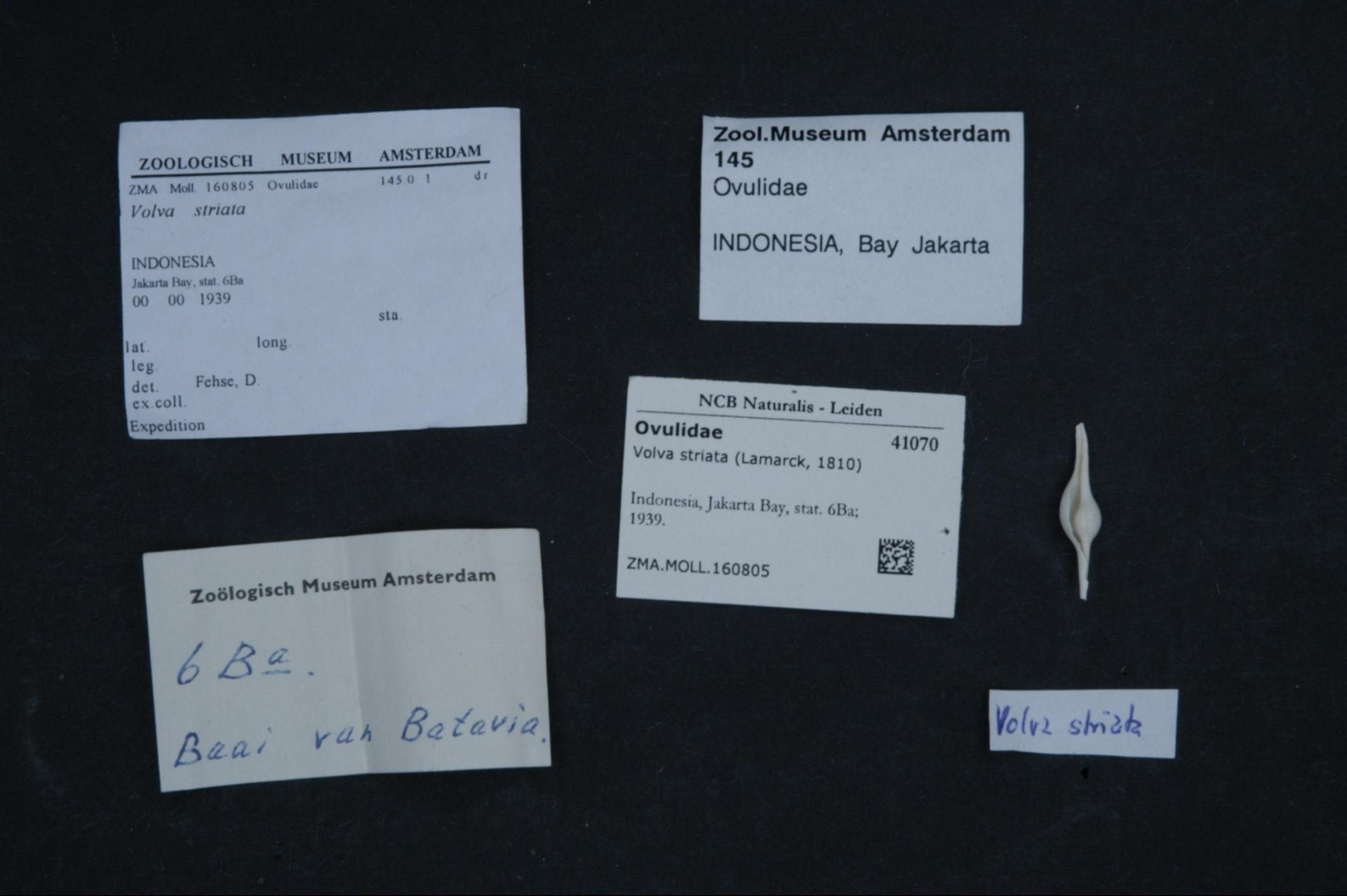

Scientific classification
- Kingdom: Animalia
- Phylum: Mollusca
- Class: Gastropoda
- Subclass: Caenogastropoda
- Order: Littorinimorpha
- Family: Ovulidae
- Genus: Volva
- Species: V. striata

Binomial name
- Volva striata (Lamarck, 1810)

Synonyms
- Ovula striata Lamarck, 1810 Volva volva chongwuensis Huang & Wang, 1993 Volva volva striata (Lamarck, 1810)

= Volva striata =

Species of gastropod

Volva striata is a species of sea snail, a marine gastropod mollusk in the family Ovulidae, the ovulids, cowry allies or false cowries.
