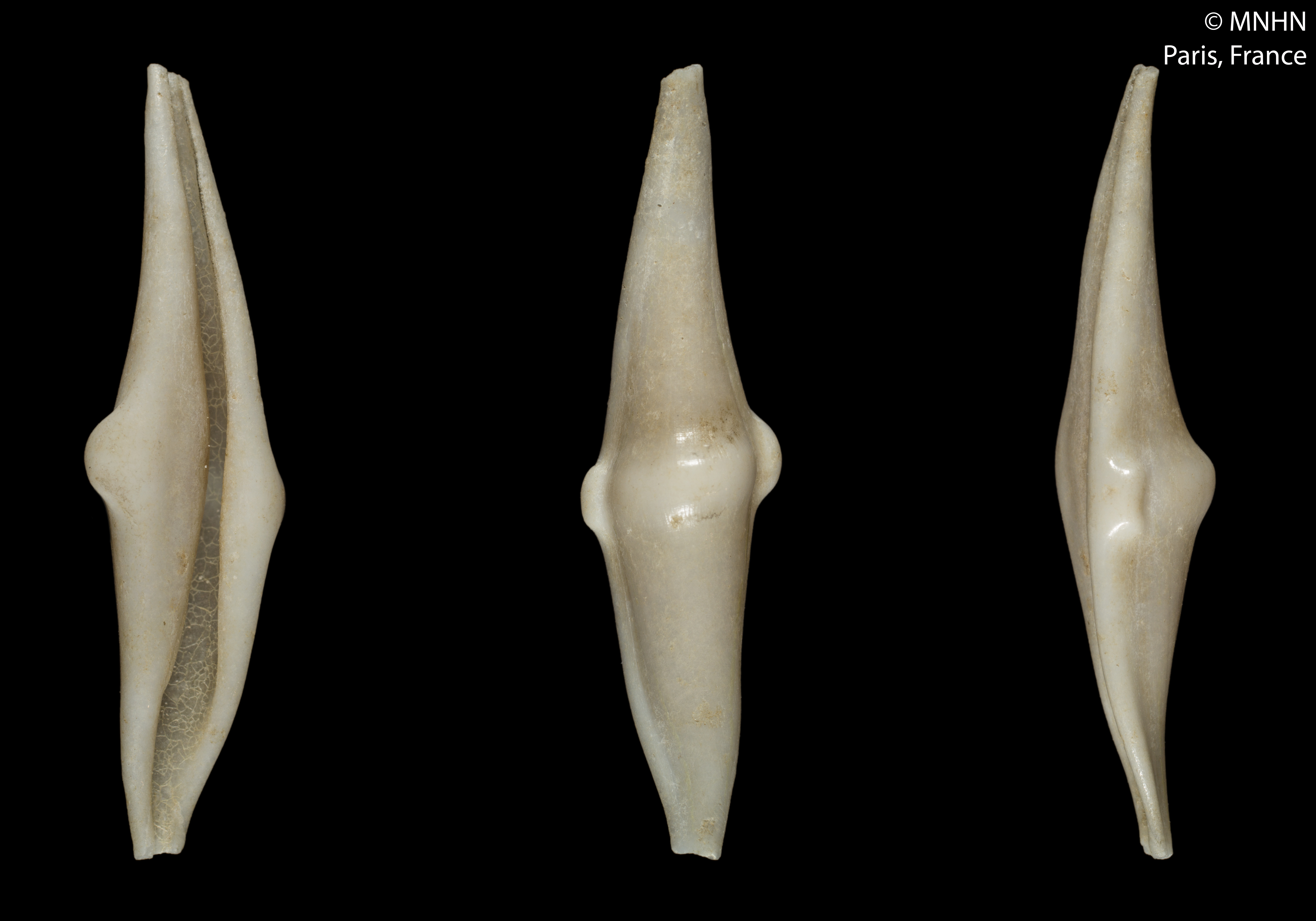
- Shell of Calcarovula arthritica

Scientific classification
- Kingdom: Animalia
- Phylum: Mollusca
- Class: Gastropoda
- Subclass: Caenogastropoda
- Order: Littorinimorpha
- Superfamily: Cypraeoidea
- Family: Ovulidae
- Genus: Calcarovula; Cate, 1973

Type species
- Cantharus aldermenensis Powell, 1971

Synonyms
- Calcaria Cate, 1973; Phenacovolva (Calcaria) C. N. Cate, 1973 (Invalid: junior homonym of Calcaria Porat, 1878 [Myriapoda]; Calcarovula is a replacement name)

= Calcarovula =

Genus of gastropods

Calcarovula is a genus of sea snails, marine gastropod mollusks in the family Ovulidae.

== Species ==
Species within the genus Calcarovula include:

- Calcarovula arthritica Lorenz & Fehse, 2009
- Calcarovula gracillima (E. A. Smith, 1901)
- Calcarovula ildiko Lorenz, 2006
- Calcarovula longirostrata (Sowerby I, 1828)
- Calcarovula mikado (Kurohara & Habe, 1991)
- Calcarovula piragua (Dall, 1889)

Species brought into synonymy

- Calcarovula virgo Azuma, 1974: synonym of Calcarovula longirostrata (G.B. Sowerby I, 1828)
