= Phenacovolva schmidi =

Scientific classification
- Kingdom: Animalia
- Phylum: Mollusca
- Class: Gastropoda
- Subclass: Caenogastropoda
- Order: Littorinimorpha
- Family: Ovulidae
- Genus: Phenacovolva
- Species: P. schmidi

Binomial name
- Phenacovolva schmidi Fehse & Wiese, 1993

Species of gastropod

Phenacovolva schmidi is a species of sea snail, a marine gastropod mollusc in the family Ovulidae, the ovulids, cowry allies or false cowries.
