= Phenacovolva zuidafrikaana =

Scientific classification
- Kingdom: Animalia
- Phylum: Mollusca
- Class: Gastropoda
- Subclass: Caenogastropoda
- Order: Littorinimorpha
- Family: Ovulidae
- Genus: Phenacovolva
- Species: P. zuidafrikaana

Binomial name
- Phenacovolva zuidafrikaana (Cate, 1975)

Synonyms
- Amphiperas smithi Bartsch, 1915; Amphiperas smithi Sowerby III, 1894

Species of gastropod

Phenacovolva zuidafrikaana is a species of sea snail, a marine gastropod mollusc in the family Ovulidae, the ovulids, cowry allies or false cowries.
