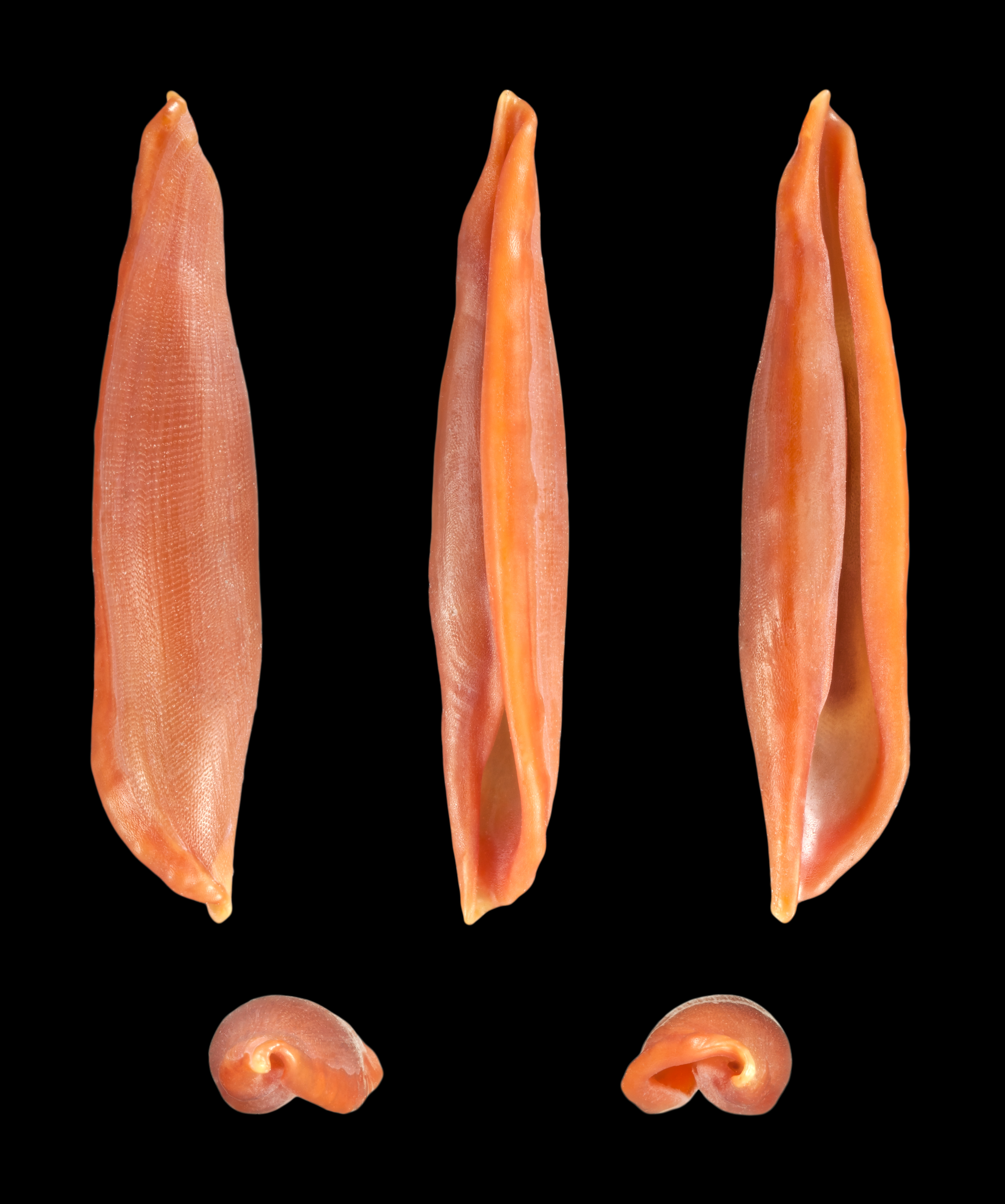
- Aclyvolva lanceolata

Scientific classification
- Kingdom: Animalia
- Phylum: Mollusca
- Class: Gastropoda
- Subclass: Caenogastropoda
- Order: Littorinimorpha
- Family: Ovulidae
- Genus: Aclyvolva
- Species: A. lanceolata

Binomial name
- Aclyvolva lanceolata (G.B. Sowerby II, 1849)

Synonyms
- Aclyvolva lamyi (F. A. Schilder, 1932); Aclyvolva nicolamassierae Fehse, 1999; Neosimnia lamyi Schilder, 1932 ·; Ovula rosea Rossiter, 1883; Ovulum lanceolatum G.B. Sowerby II, 1848

= Aclyvolva lanceolata =

Species of gastropod

Aclyvolva lanceolata is a species of sea snail, a marine gastropod mollusk in the family Ovulidae, the ovulids, cowry allies or false cowries.

== Description ==
The size of an adult shell varies between 14 mm and 35 mm.

The aperture is narrow, except towards the anterior, where the outer lip is bent outward. The base of the shell is flat and the inner lip is edged with a reddish line.

== Distribution ==
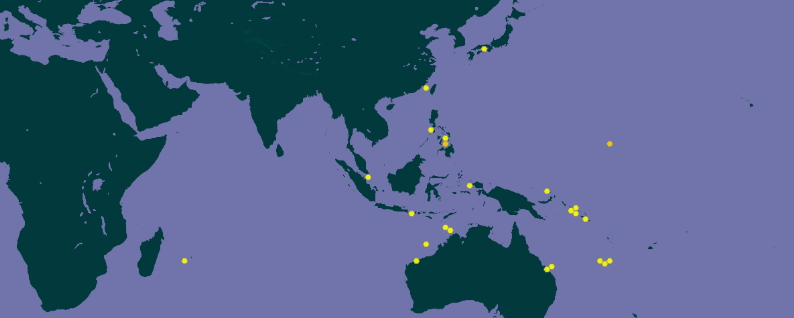
Distribution

This marine species occurs in the central Indo-Pacific area including areas such as India, Japan, New Guinea and New Caledonia and the Loyalty Islands.
