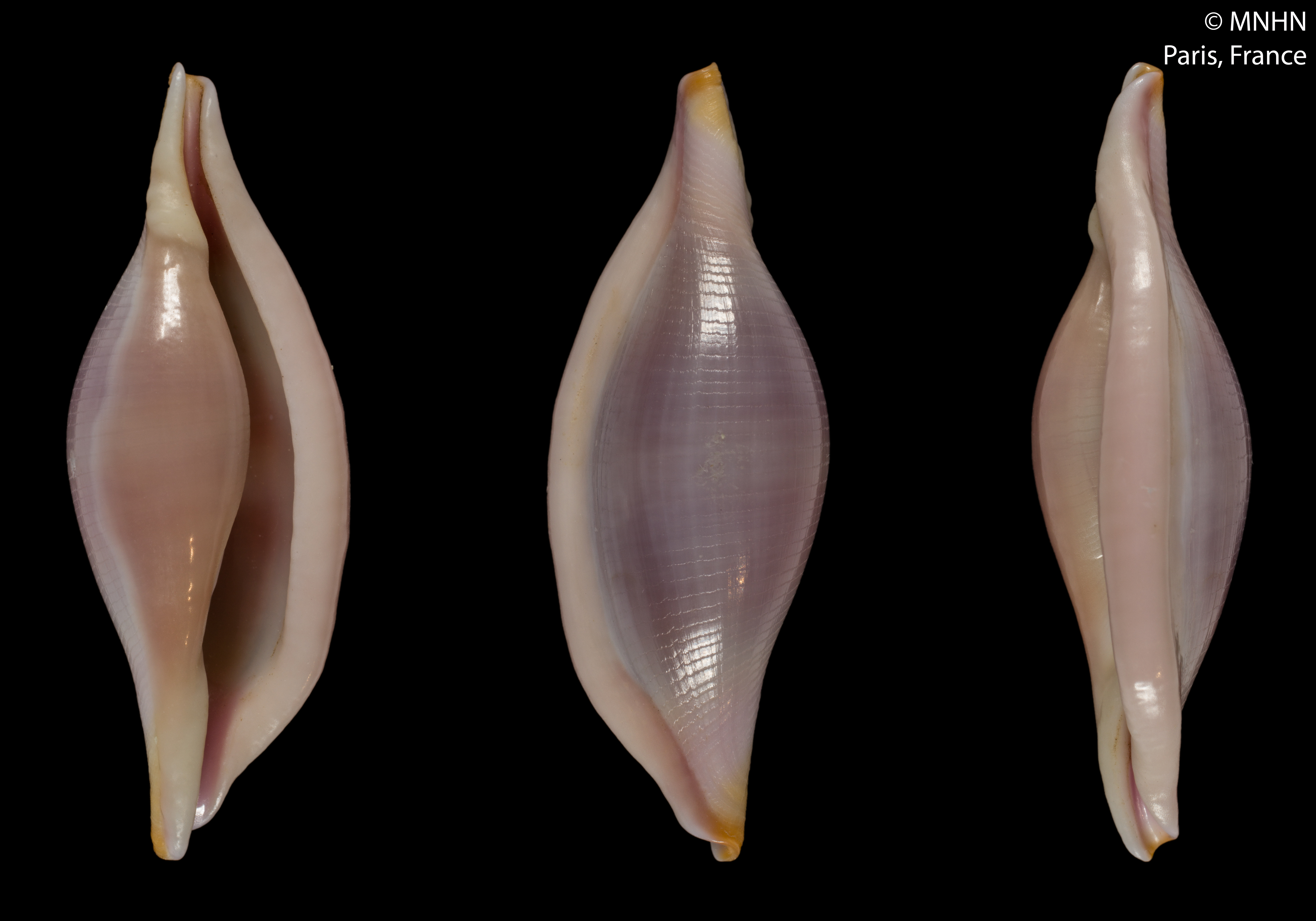
- Shell of Phenacovolva barbieri (holotype at MNHN, Paris)

Scientific classification
- Kingdom: Animalia
- Phylum: Mollusca
- Class: Gastropoda
- Subclass: Caenogastropoda
- Order: Littorinimorpha
- Family: Ovulidae
- Genus: Phenacovolva
- Species: P. barbieri

Binomial name
- Phenacovolva barbieri Lorenz & Fehse, 2009

= Phenacovolva barbieri =

Species of gastropod

Phenacovolva barbieri is a species of sea snail, a marine gastropod mollusc in the family Ovulidae, the ovulids, cowry allies or false cowries.

== Description ==
The length of the shell attains 31.9 mm.

== Distribution ==
This marine species occurs off the Philippines.
