= Phenacovolva subreflexa =

Scientific classification
- Kingdom: Animalia
- Phylum: Mollusca
- Class: Gastropoda
- Subclass: Caenogastropoda
- Order: Littorinimorpha
- Family: Ovulidae
- Genus: Phenacovolva
- Species: P. subreflexa

Binomial name
- Phenacovolva subreflexa (Sowerby II in A. Adams & Reeve, 1848)

Synonyms
- Ovulum gracilis Sowerby II in A. Adams & Reeve, 1848; Ovulum subreflexum A. Adams & Reeve, 1848; Phenacovolva gracilis (Sowerby II in A. Adams & Reeve, 1848)

Species of gastropod

Phenacovolva subreflexa is a species of sea snail, a marine gastropod mollusc in the family Ovulidae, the ovulids, cowry allies or false cowries.
