= Aclyvolva rubracarinata =

Scientific classification
- Kingdom: Animalia
- Phylum: Mollusca
- Class: Gastropoda
- Subclass: Caenogastropoda
- Order: Littorinimorpha
- Superfamily: Cypraeoidea
- Family: Ovulidae
- Genus: Aclyvolva
- Species: A. rubracarinata

Binomial name
- Aclyvolva rubracarinata Fehse, 2018

Species of gastropod

Aclyvolva rubracarinata is a species of sea snail, a marine gastropod mollusk in the family Ovulidae, the ovulids, cowry allies or false cowries.

== Distribution ==
This marine species occurs off the Philippines.
