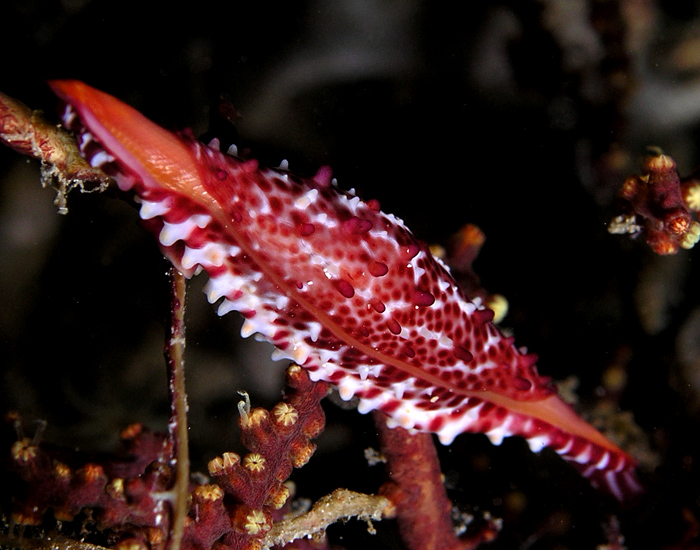
- A live Phenacovolva nectarea

Scientific classification
- Kingdom: Animalia
- Phylum: Mollusca
- Class: Gastropoda
- Subclass: Caenogastropoda
- Order: Littorinimorpha
- Family: Ovulidae
- Genus: Phenacovolva
- Species: P. nectarea

Binomial name
- Phenacovolva nectarea Iredale, 1930

Synonyms
- Phenacovolva tokioi Cate, 1973

= Phenacovolva nectarea =

Species of gastropod

Phenacovolva nectarea is a species of sea snail, a marine gastropod mollusc in the family Ovulidae, the ovulids, cowry allies or false cowries.
