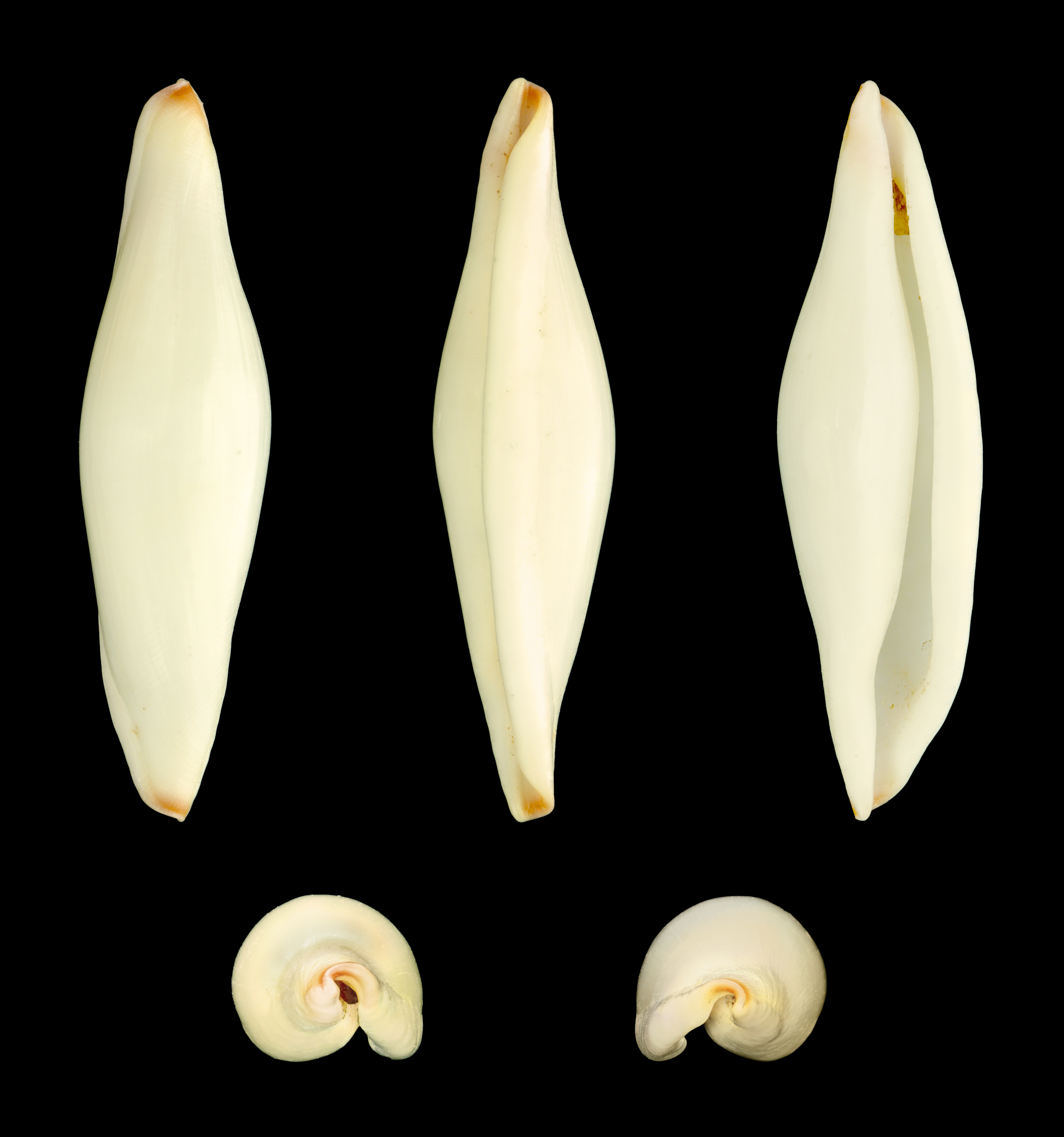

Scientific classification
- Kingdom: Animalia
- Phylum: Mollusca
- Class: Gastropoda
- Subclass: Caenogastropoda
- Order: Littorinimorpha
- Family: Ovulidae
- Genus: Pellasimnia
- Species: P. improcera

Binomial name
- Pellasimnia improcera (Azuma & Cate, 1971)

Synonyms
- Dissona hasta Cate & Azuma in Cate, 1973; Phenacovolva improcera (Azuma & Cate, 1971)

= Pellasimnia improcera =

Species of gastropod

Pellasimnia improcera is a species of sea snail, a marine gastropod mollusk in the family Ovulidae, the ovulids, cowry allies or false cowries.
