= Phenacovolva recurva =

Scientific classification
- Kingdom: Animalia
- Phylum: Mollusca
- Class: Gastropoda
- Subclass: Caenogastropoda
- Order: Littorinimorpha
- Family: Ovulidae
- Genus: Phenacovolva
- Species: P. recurva

Binomial name
- Phenacovolva recurva (Sowerby II in A. Adams & Reeve, 1848)

Synonyms
- Cyphoma elongatum A. Adams, 1854; Ovulum recurvum A. Adams & Reeve, 1843; Phenacovolva diantha Cate, 1973; Phenacovolva kiiensis Azuma & Cate, 1971; Volva longirostrata (Sowerby II, 1829)

Species of gastropod

Phenacovolva recurva is a species of medium-sized sea snail, a marine gastropod mollusc in the family Ovulidae.

This species is found in the western Pacific from Japan to northern New Zealand.
