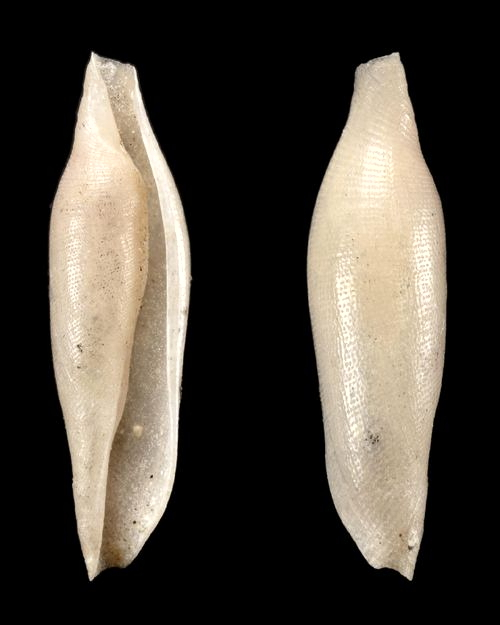
- Shell of Aclyvolva coarctata (holotype at the Natural History Museum, London)

Scientific classification
- Kingdom: Animalia
- Phylum: Mollusca
- Class: Gastropoda
- Subclass: Caenogastropoda
- Order: Littorinimorpha
- Superfamily: Cypraeoidea
- Family: Ovulidae
- Genus: Aclyvolva
- Species: A. coarctata

Binomial name
- Aclyvolva coarctata (G.B. Sowerby II, 1848)

Synonyms
- Aclyvolva vulgaris X.-T. Ma, 1986; Hiata coarctata (A. Adams & Reeve, 1848); Hiata rugosa C. N. Cate & Azuma, 1973 (original combination); Hiatavolva coarctata (G. B. Sowerby II, 1848); Hiatavolva rugosa (C. N. Cate & Azuma, 1973); Ovulum coarctatum G. B. Sowerby II, 1848 (original combination); Phenacovolva rugosa (C. N. Cate & Azuma, 1973); Primovula horimasarui M. Azuma & C. N. Cate, 1971

= Aclyvolva coarctata =

Species of gastropod

Aclyvolva coarctata is a species of sea snail, a marine gastropod mollusk in the family Ovulidae, the ovulids, cowry allies or false cowries.

== Description ==
The size of an adult shell varies between 14 mm and 35 mm.

== Distribution ==
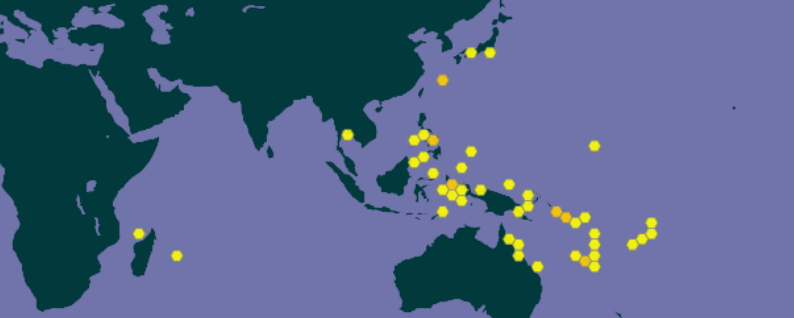
Distribution

This marine species occurs in the central Indo-Pacific area like for example in India, Japan, New Guinea and New Caledonia. The holotype was found in the Sunda Strait, Indonesia.
