= Phenacovolva aurantia =

Scientific classification
- Kingdom: Animalia
- Phylum: Mollusca
- Class: Gastropoda
- Subclass: Caenogastropoda
- Order: Littorinimorpha
- Family: Ovulidae
- Genus: Phenacovolva
- Species: P. aurantia

Binomial name
- Phenacovolva aurantia (Sowerby III, 1889)

Synonyms
- Delonovolva labroguttata (Schilder, 1969); Dissona aurantium (Sowerby III, 1889); Ovulum aurantium Sowerby III, 1889; Pellasimnia aurantia Carlsson, 1969; Phenacovolva labroguttata Schilder, 1969

Species of gastropod

Phenacovolva aurantia is a species of sea snail, a marine gastropod mollusc in the family Ovulidae, the ovulids, cowry allies or false cowries.
