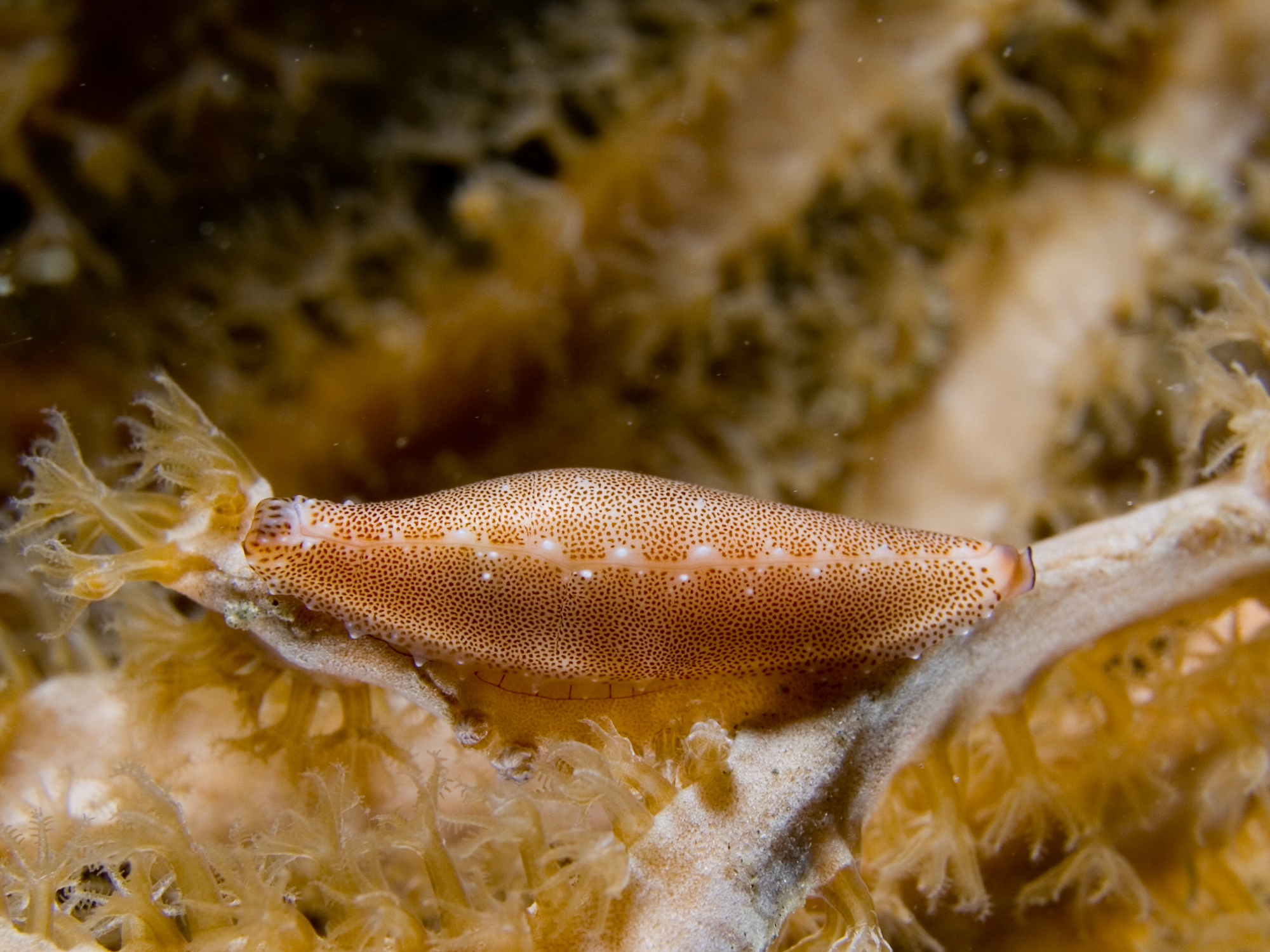

Scientific classification
- Kingdom: Animalia
- Phylum: Mollusca
- Class: Gastropoda
- Subclass: Caenogastropoda
- Order: Littorinimorpha
- Family: Ovulidae
- Genus: Pellasimnia
- Species: P. brunneiterma

Binomial name
- Pellasimnia brunneiterma (Cate, 1969)

Synonyms
- Hiata brunneiterma (Cate, 1969); Volva brunneiterma Cate, 1969

= Pellasimnia brunneiterma =

Species of gastropod

Pellasimnia brunneiterma is a species of sea snail, a marine gastropod mollusc in the family Ovulidae.

This species appears to be a cryptic species triad..
