= Calcarovula longirostrata =

Scientific classification
- Kingdom: Animalia
- Phylum: Mollusca
- Class: Gastropoda
- Subclass: Caenogastropoda
- Order: Littorinimorpha
- Family: Ovulidae
- Genus: Calcarovula
- Species: C. longirostrata

Binomial name
- Calcarovula longirostrata (Sowerby I, 1828)

Synonyms
- Calcarovula virgo Azuma, 1974; Ovulum longirostratum Sowerby I, 1828; Phenacovolva longirostrata (Sowerby I, 1828)

Species of gastropod

Calcarovula longirostrata is a species of sea snail, a marine gastropod mollusk in the family Ovulidae, the ovulids, cowry allies or false cowries.
