= Calcarovula gracillima =

Scientific classification
- Kingdom: Animalia
- Phylum: Mollusca
- Class: Gastropoda
- Subclass: Caenogastropoda
- Order: Littorinimorpha
- Family: Ovulidae
- Genus: Calcarovula
- Species: C. gracillima

Binomial name
- Calcarovula gracillima (E. A. Smith, 1901)

Synonyms
- Aclyvolva clara Cate, 1973; Phenacovolva gracillima (E. A. Smith, 1901); Phenacovolva yoshioi Azuma & Cate, 1971; Radius gracillimus E. A. Smith, 1901

Species of gastropod

Calcarovula gracillima is a species of sea snail, a marine gastropod mollusk in the family Ovulidae, the ovulids, cowry allies or false cowries.

== Distribution ==
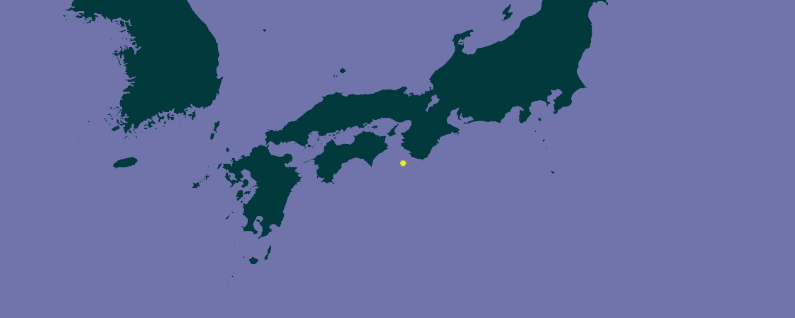
Distribution

This species occurs in the Pacific Ocean off Japan.
