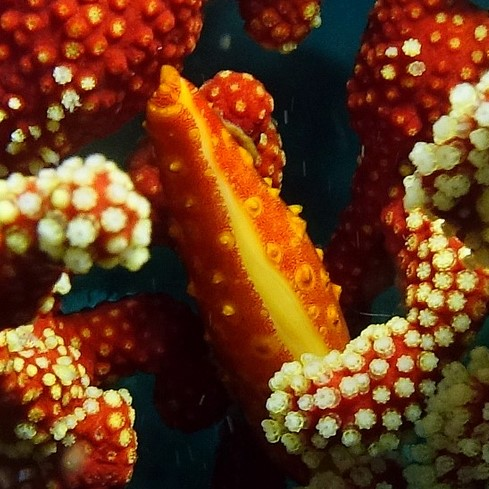

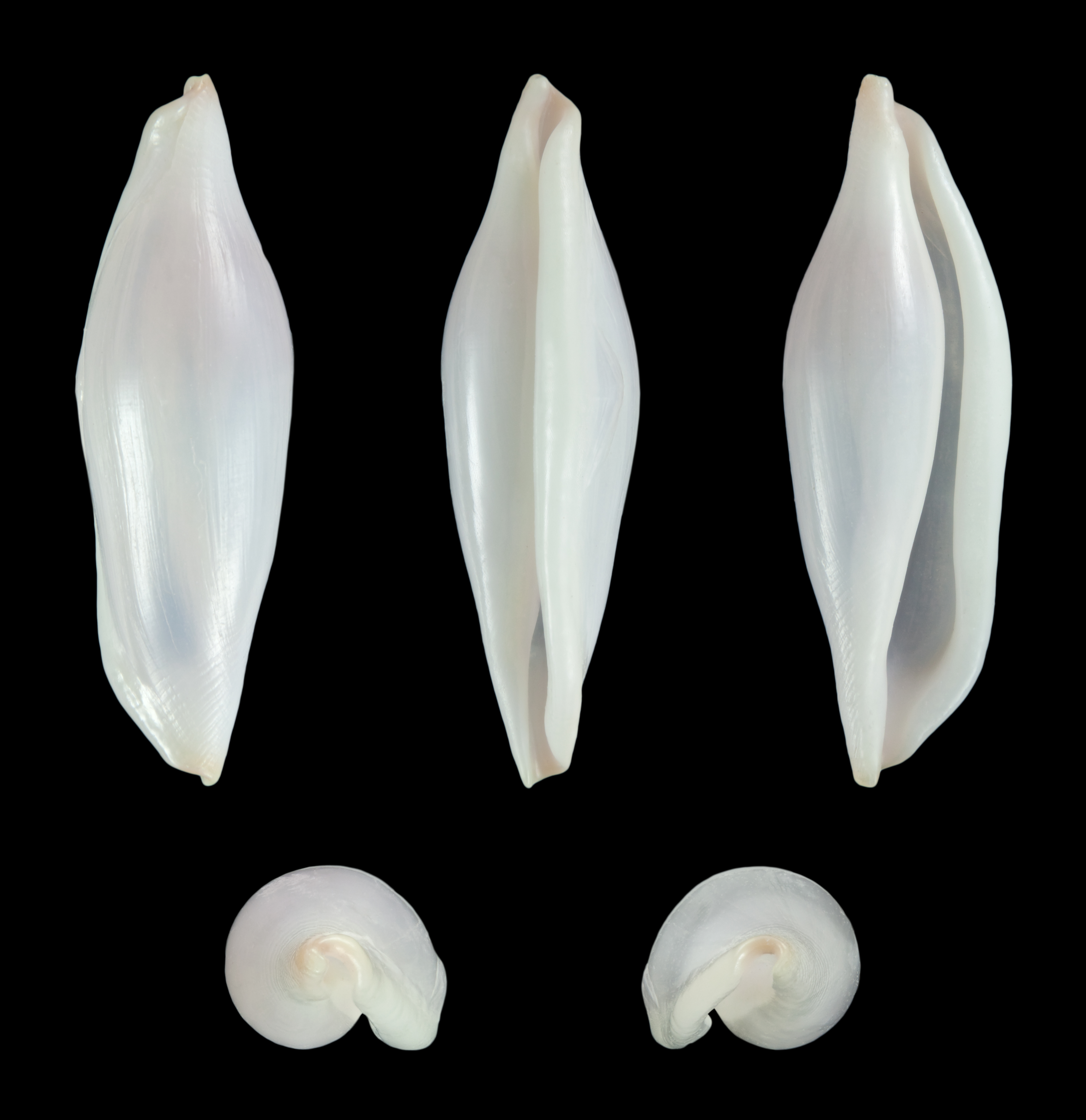
- Live animal amongst coral (top) and views of shells (bottom)

Scientific classification
- Kingdom: Animalia
- Phylum: Mollusca
- Class: Gastropoda
- Subclass: Caenogastropoda
- Order: Littorinimorpha
- Family: Ovulidae
- Genus: Pellasimnia
- Species: P. angasi

Binomial name
- Pellasimnia angasi (Reeve, 1865)

Synonyms
- List: Aclyvolva haynesi (Sowerby III, 1889); Aclyvolva lamyi (Schilder, 1932); Neosimnia lamyi Schilder, 1932; Neosimnia subreflexa Allan, 1956; Ovulum angasi Reeve, 1865; Ovulum haynesi Sowerby, 1889; Pellasimnia angasi (Reeve, 1865); Phenacovolva angasi Reeve, 1865); Phenacovolva exsul Iredale, 1935; Phenacovolva haynesi (G. B. Sowerby III, 1889); Volva haynesi (G. B. Sowerby III, 1889)

= Pellasimnia angasi =

Species of gastropod

Pellasimnia angasi, commonly known as Angas's volva, is a species of sea snail, a marine gastropod mollusk in the family Ovulidae, the ovulids, cowry allies or false cowries.

== Description ==
The size of an adult shell varies between 10 mm and 38 mm.

== Distribution ==
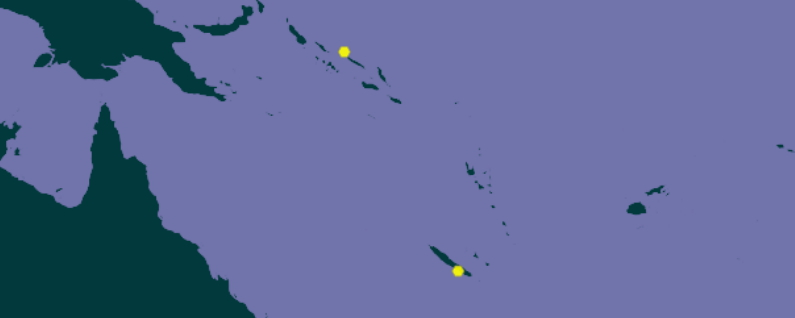
Distribution

This species occurs in the Pacific Ocean off Japan and Australia.
