= Wilhelm Dunker =

German geologist, paleontologist and zoologist

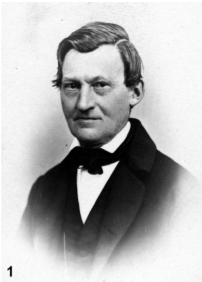
Wilhelm Dunker

Wilhelm Dunker, full name Wilhelm Bernhard Rudolph Hadrian Dunker (21 February 1809, Eschwege – 13 March 1885, Marburg) was a German geologist, paleontologist and zoologist (specifically a malacologist).

Wilhelm Dunker studied mining and metallurgical engineering in Göttingen and worked at first as a trainee with the local mining authority. Soon thereafter he was appointed a teacher of mineralogical sciences at the poly-technical school in Kassel. In 1854 he was appointed professor at the University of Marburg, at which he taught up to his death. Dunker was one of the most important malacologists of his time. He had a very extensive private collection of snails and shells, which he constantly increased by exchange with other collectors (and probably also by purchases). He maintained contacts with his contemporaries Rudolph Amandus Philippi, Ludwig Karl Georg Pfeiffer, Hugh Cuming and Johannes Albers. By exchange he also acquired numerous original specimens and types from these authors.

After his death, Dunker's mollusc collection was purchased by the Prussian state and placed in the Museum für Naturkunde in Berlin, under the curatorship of Eduard von Martens, where it remains to this day. Wilhelm Dunker wrote a large number of scientific publications on the systematics of the Mollusca and described numerous new species. In the year 1846, together with Hermann von Meyer, he founded the magazine "Palaeontographica".

== Works ==
=== Palaeontology ===
- 1837. Beiträge zur Kenntnis des norddeutschen Oolithgebildes.
- 1844. Vorläufige Diagnosen mehrerer neuer Conchylien aus der norddeutschen Liasbildung, die nächstens ausführlicher beschrieben und abgebildet werden. Zeitschrift für Malakozoologie 1: 186–188.
- 1846. Monographie der norddeutschen Wealdenbildung.
- 1846. Ueber die in dem Lias bei Halberstadt vorkommenden Versteinerungen. Palaeontographica, 1: 34–41.
- 1846. Diagnosen neuer Konchylien aus der norddeutschen Liasbildung. Zeitschrift für Malakozoologie 3: 168–170.
- 1847. Ueber die in dem Lias bei Halberstadt vorkommenden Versteinerungen (Fortsetzungen). Palaeontographica, 1: 107–112, 113–125.
- 1847. Ueber einige neue Versteinerungen aus verschiedenen Gebirgsformationen. Palaeontographica, 1: 128–133.
- 1848. Ueber die in der Molasse bei Günzburg unfern Ulm vorkommenden Conchylien und Pflanzenreste. Palaeontographica, 1:155–168.
- 1848. Nachtrag zu der Beschreibung der in dem Lias bei Halberstadt vorkommenden Versteinerungen. Palaeontographica, 1: 176–181.
- 1848. Ueber einen neuen Asteracanthus aus dem Korallenkalk des Lindener Berges bei Hannover. Palaeontographica, 1: 188–189.
- 1851. Ueber die im Muschelkalk von Oberschlesien bis jetzt gefundenen Mollusken. Palaeontographica, 1: 283–310.
- 1851. Ueber Ammonites Gervilianus, d'Orb. aus dem norddeutschen Hilsthone. Palaeontographica, 1: 324–325.
- 1851. Capulus Hartlebeni, eine neue Schnecke aus dem Muschelkalk der Gegend von Elze im Hannoverschen. Palaeontographica, 1: 334–334.
- 1851. Ammonites Buchii, v. Alb. und A. parcus, L. v. Buch aus der Cölestinschicht des Muschelkalks von Wogau bei Jena. Palaeontographica, 1: 335–336.
- 1856. Ueber mehrere Pflanzenreste aus dem Quadersandsteine von Blankenburg. Palaeontographica, 4: 179–183.
- 1862–1864. Ueber die im plastischen Thone von Grossalmerode vorkommenden Mollusken. Palaeontographica, 9: 86–90.

=== Zoology ===
- 1845. Beschreibung einer neuen Cyclas-Art. Zeitschrift für Malakozoologie 2:20.
- 1845. Diagnoses molluscorum qourandum novorum, quae ex itinere ad oras Africae occidentalis reportavit cl. G. Tams, Med. Dr. Zeitschrift für Malakozoologie 2: 163–168.
- 1846. Briefliche Mittheilung übere einige Bulimus-Arten. Zeitschrift für Malakozoologie 2: 176–177.
- 1846. Diagnoses molluscorum novorum, quae ex itinere ad oras Africae occidentalis reportavit Dr. Tams. Zeitschrift für Malakozoologie 3: 24–28.
- 1846. Diagnosen neuer Konchylien. Zeitschrift für Malakozoologie 3: 48.
- 1846. Diagnoses Molluscorum novorum. Zeitschrift für Malakozoologie 3: 108–112.
- 1846. Diagnoses Buccinorum quorundam novorum. Zeitschrift für Malakozoologie 3: 170–172.
- 1847. Diagnoses Buccinorum quorundam novorum. Zeitschrift für Malakozoologie 4: 59–64.
- 1848. Diagnoses Molluscorum novorum. Zeitschrift für Malakozoologie 5: 177–186.
- 1848. Diagnoses specierum novarum generis Planorbis collectionis Cumingianae. Proceedings of the Zoological Society of London 16: 40–43.
- 1850. Diagnoses molluscorum quorundam novorum. Zeitschrift für Malakozoologie 7: 30–32.
- 1852. Diagnoses molluscorum novorum. Zeitschrift für Malakozoologie 9: 49–62.
- 1852. Argonauta gruneri Dunker. Zeitschrift für Malakozoologie 9: 48.
- 1852. Aviculacea nova. Zeitschrift für Malakozoologie 9: 73–80.
- 1852. Diagnoses Molluscorum novorum. Zeitschrift für Malakozoologie 9: 125–128, 189–191.
- 1853. Diagnoses Molluscorum novorum. Zeitschrift für Malakozoologie 10: 58–60.
- 1853. Ampullaria eximia. Zeitschrift für Malakozoologie 10: 93–95.
- 1853. Diagnoses Molluscorum novorum. Zeitschrift für Malakozoologie 10: 95–96.
- 1853. Neue Mytilaceen. Zeitschrift für Malakozoologie 10: 82–92.
- 1853. Diagnoses Molluscorum novorum. Zeitschrift für Malakozoologie 10: 110–112.
- 1853. Index molluscorum, quae in itinere ad Guineam inferiorem collegit Georgius Tams med. Dr. Theodor Fischer, Cassel.
- 1853. Limnaeacea nova collectionis Cumingianae. Proceedings of the Zoological Society of London 21: 53–54.
- 1855. Bulimus ochsenii Dunker. Malakozoologische Blätter 2: 107.
- 1856. Mollusca nova collectionis Cumingianae. Proceedings of the Zoological Society of London 24: 254–358.
- 1856. Mytilacea nova collectionis Cumingianae. Proceedings of the Zoological Society of London 24: 358–366.
- 1857. Clausilia lanzai Dunker. Malakozoologische Blätter 4: 232.
- 1858. Einige neue Species der Naiaden. Malakozoologische Blätter 5: 225–229.
- 1858–1870. Beschreibung und Abbildung neuer oder wenig bekannter Meeres-Conchylien, ser. Novitates conchologicae (Dunker, W. ed.), vol. 2 Mollusca marina (Dunker, W. ed.). Theodor Fischer, Cassel
- 1859. Neue japanische Mollusken. Malakozoologische Blätter 6: 221–240.
- 1859. Laimodonta pfeifferi Dunker. Malakozoologische Blätter 6: 201–202.
- 1861. Beschreibung einiger von Herrn Dr. v. Hochstetter auf Neuseeland gesammelten Süsswasser-Mollusken. Malakozoologische Blätter 8: 150–154.
- 1861. Mollusca Japonica. Schweitzerbart, Stuttgart.
- 1861. Beschreibung neuer Mollusken. Malakozoologische Blätter 8: 35–45.
- 1861. Solenacea nova collectionis Cumingianae. Proceedings of the Zoological Society of London 29: 418–427.
- 1862. Zwei neue Physen von Hochstetter entdeckt. Malakozoologische Blätter 9: 150–151.
- 1862. Species nonnullae Bursarum vel Ranellarum collectionis Cumingianae. Proceedings of the Zoological Society of London 30: 238–240.
- 1863. Eine neue Voluta. Malakozoologische Blätter 10: 145.
- 1864. Fünf neue Mollusken. Malakozoologische Blätter 11: 99–102.
- 1864. Eine neue Bulimus. Malakozoologische Blätter 11: 156.
- 1866. Bericht über die von der Novara-Expedition mitgebrachten Mollusken. Verhandlungen der kaiserlich- königlichen zoologisch-botanischen Gesellschaft in Wien 16: 909–916 (mit Zelebor).
- 1867. Zwei neue Süsswasser-Muscheln aus Afrika. Malakozoologische Blätter 14: 206–209.
- 1871. Mollusca nova Musei Godeffroy Hamburgiensis. Malakozoologische Blätter 18: 150–175.
- 1872. Die Gattung Avicula in Abbildungennach der Natur mit Beschreibungen, ser. Systematisches Conchylien-Cabinet von Martini und Chemnitz (Küster, H.C. ed.), vol. 7. Bauer & Raspe, Nürnberg.
- 1874. Drei neue Meeresconchylien der norwegischen Fauna. Nachrichtsblatt der Deutschen Malakozoologischen Gesellschaft 6: 7 (mit Metzger).
- 1875. Diagnosen zweier neuer Bulimi. Nachrichtsblatt der Deutschen Malakozoologischen Gesellschaft 7: 28–29.
- 1875. Verzeichnis der Species einiger Gattungen zweischaliger Mollusken des rothen Meeres. Jahrbücher der Deutschen Malakozoologischen Gesellschaft 2: 1–6.
- 1875. Zwei neue Bulimi aus der Sierra Nevada (Columbien). Jahrbücher der Deutschen Malakozoologischen Gesellschaft 2: 220–221.
- 1875. Ueber Conchylien von Desterro, Prov. Sta. Catharina, Brasilien. Jahrbücher der Deutschen Malakozoologischen Gesellschaft 2: 240–254.
- 1877. Mollusca nonnulla nova maris Japonici. Malakozoologische Blätter 24: 67–75.
- 1879. Mollusca quaedam nova. Journal de Conchyliologie 27: 212–217.
- 1882. Index Molluscorum Maris Japonici. Theodor Fischer, Cassel.
- 1882. De Molluscis nonnullis terrestribus Americae australis. Jahrbücher der Deutschen Malakozoologischen Gesellschaft 9: 377–380.
- 1882. Die Gattung Lithophaga in Abbildungen nach der Natur mit Beschreibungen, ser. Systematisches Conchylien-Cabinet von Martini und Chemnitz, vol. 8. Bauer & Raspe, Nürnberg.
- 1883. Zwei neue Murices. Malakozoologische Blätter, Neue Folgen 6: 35–36.
- 1886. Die Familie der Limnaeiden enthaltend die Genera Planorbis, Limnaeus, Physa und Amphipepla. In Abbildungen nach der Natur und Beschreibungen, ser. Systematische Conchylien-Cabinet von Martini und Chemnitz (Küster, H.C., Kobelt, W. & Weinkauff, H.C. ed.), vol. 1, No. 17 [a], Bauer & Raspe, Nürnberg (zusammen mit Küster, H.C. & Clessin, S.).
