= Contrasimnia pagoda =

Scientific classification
- Kingdom: Animalia
- Phylum: Mollusca
- Class: Gastropoda
- Subclass: Caenogastropoda
- Order: Littorinimorpha
- Family: Ovulidae
- Genus: Contrasimnia
- Species: C. pagoda

Binomial name
- Contrasimnia pagoda (Cate, 1973)

Synonyms
- Xandarovula pagoda Cate, 1973

Species of gastropod

Contrasimnia pagoda is a species of sea snail, a marine gastropod mollusk in the family Ovulidae, the ovulids, cowry allies or false cowries.
