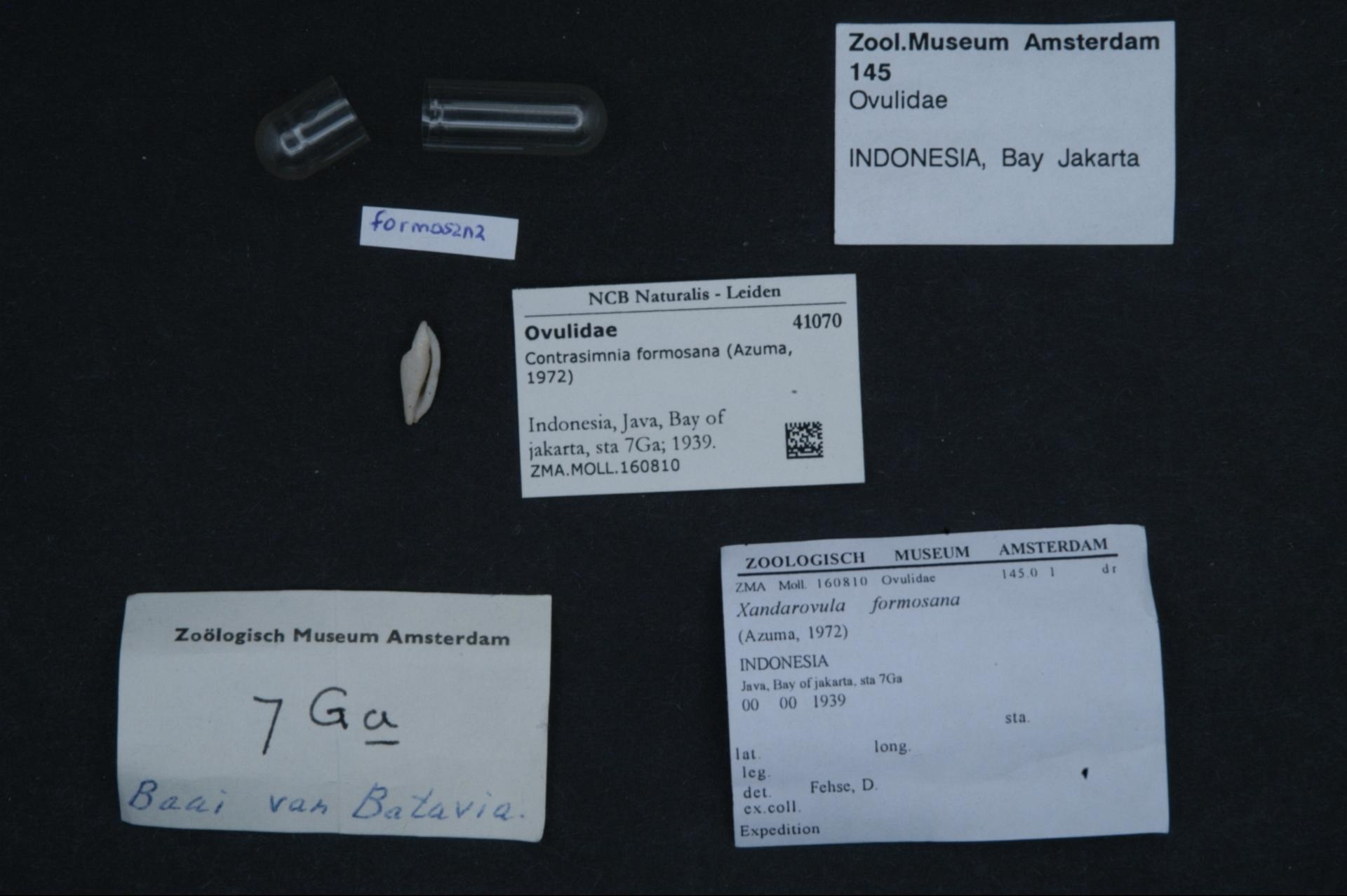

Scientific classification
- Kingdom: Animalia
- Phylum: Mollusca
- Class: Gastropoda
- Subclass: Caenogastropoda
- Order: Littorinimorpha
- Family: Ovulidae
- Genus: Contrasimnia
- Species: C. formosana

Binomial name
- Contrasimnia formosana (Azuma, 1972)

= Contrasimnia formosana =

Species of gastropod

Contrasimnia formosana is a species of sea snail, a marine gastropod mollusk in the family Ovulidae, the ovulids, cowry allies or false cowries.
