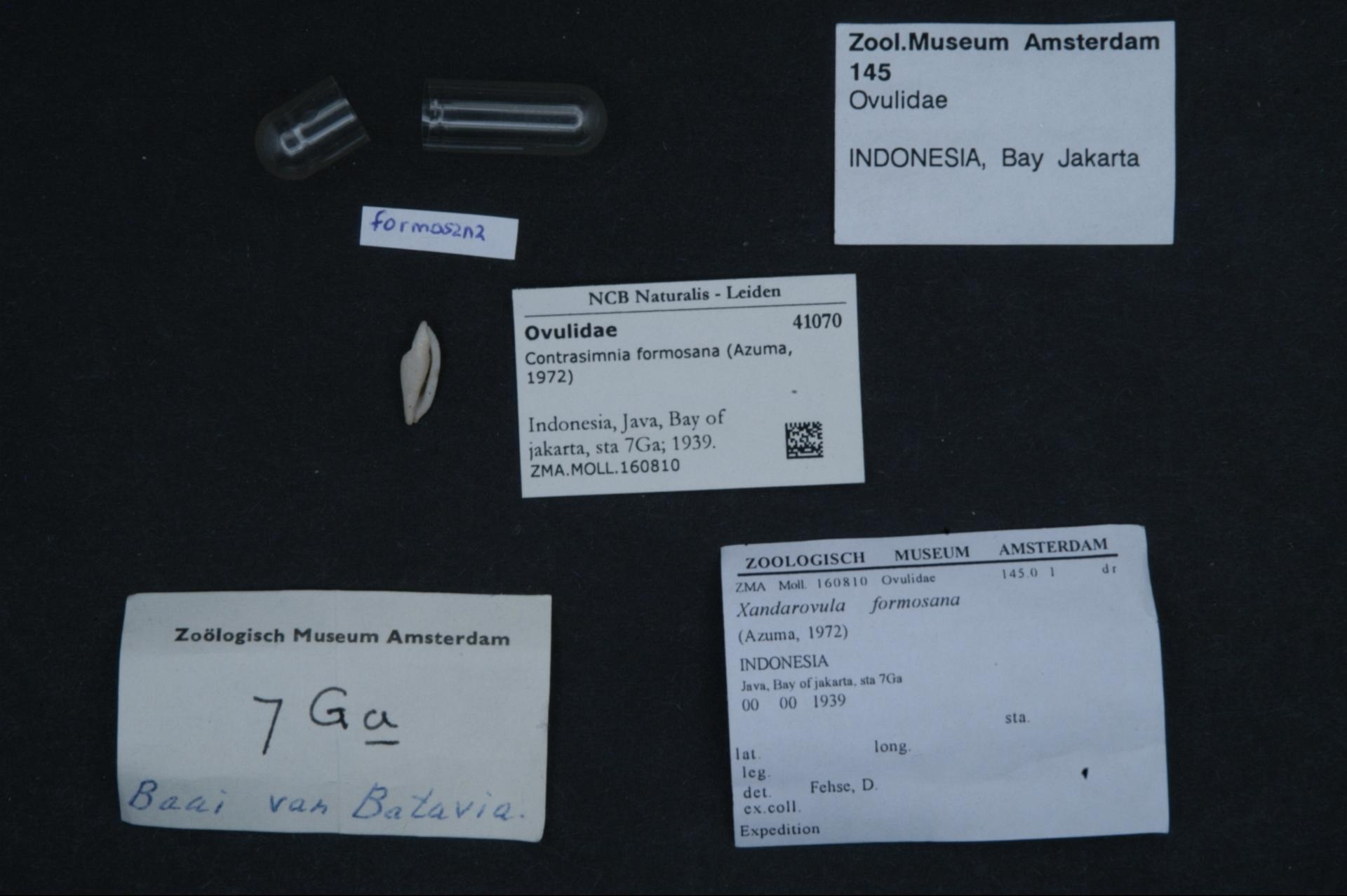
- Contrasimnia formosana

Scientific classification
- Kingdom: Animalia
- Phylum: Mollusca
- Class: Gastropoda
- Subclass: Caenogastropoda
- Order: Littorinimorpha
- Family: Ovulidae
- Subfamily: Simniinae
- Genus: Contrasimnia; Lorenz & Fehse, 2009

= Contrasimnia =

Genus of gastropods

Contrasimnia is a genus of sea snails, marine gastropod mollusks in the family Ovulidae.

== Species ==
Species within the genus Contrasimnia include:

- Contrasimnia formosana (Azuma, 1972)
- Contrasimnia pagoda (Cate, 1973)
- Contrasimnia xanthochila (Kuroda, 1928)
