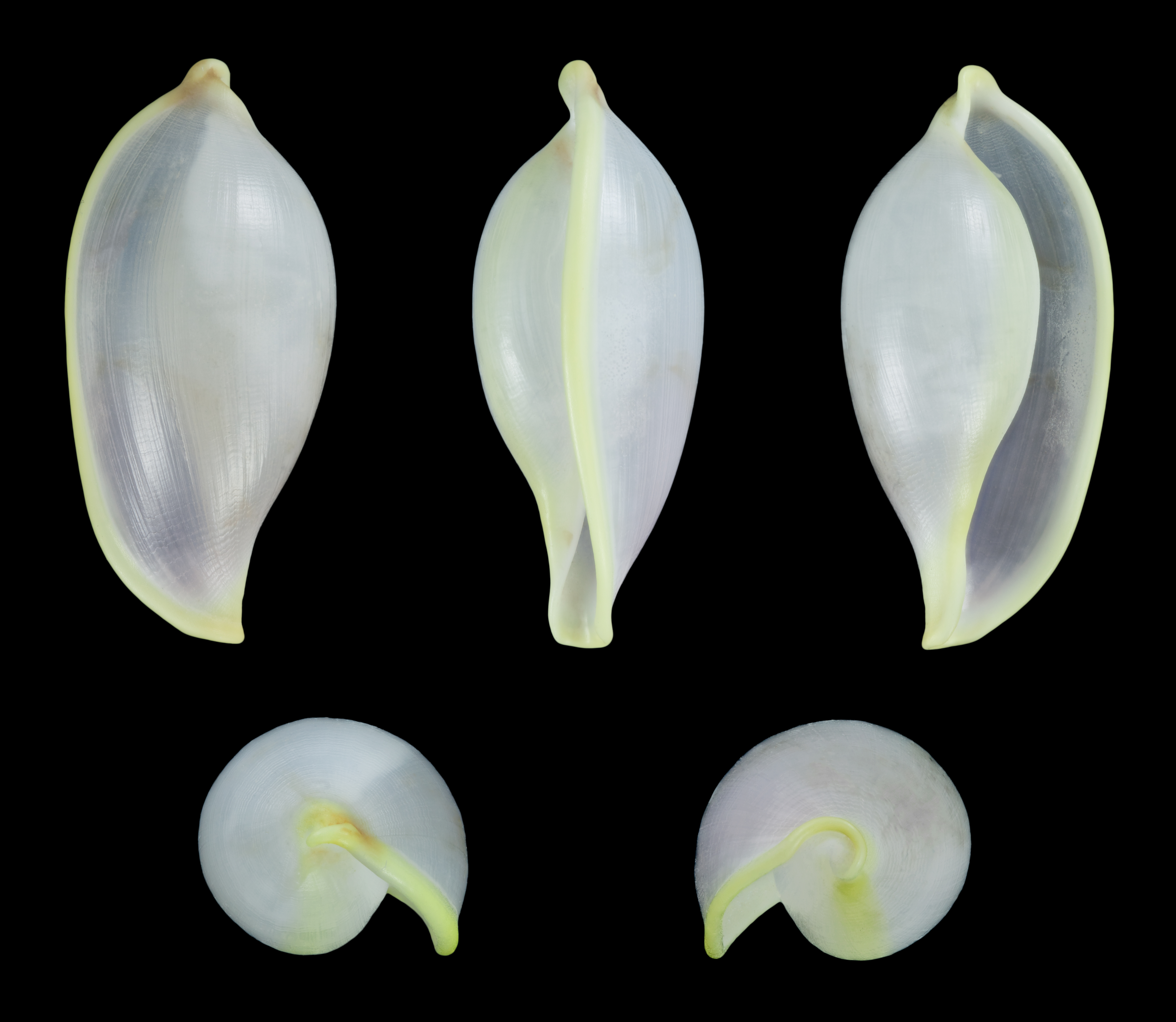

Scientific classification
- Kingdom: Animalia
- Phylum: Mollusca
- Class: Gastropoda
- Subclass: Caenogastropoda
- Order: Littorinimorpha
- Family: Ovulidae
- Genus: Contrasimnia
- Species: C. xanthochila

Binomial name
- Contrasimnia xanthochila (Kuroda, 1928)

Synonyms
- Neosimnia hirasei Schilder, 1932; Simnia xanthochila Kuroda, 1928; Xandarovula xanthochila (Kuroda, 1928)

= Contrasimnia xanthochila =

Species of gastropod

Contrasimnia xanthochila is a species of sea snail, a marine gastropod mollusk in the family Ovulidae, the ovulids, cowry allies or false cowries.
